The war in Donbas, or Donbas war, was an armed conflict in the Donbas region of Ukraine, part of the broader Russo-Ukrainian War.

In March 2014, following Ukraine's Revolution of Dignity, anti-revolution and pro-Russian protests began in Ukraine's Donetsk and Luhansk oblasts, collectively 'the Donbas'. These began as Russia invaded and annexed Crimea. Armed Russian-backed separatists seized Ukrainian government buildings in the Donbas and declared the Donetsk and Luhansk republics (DPR and LPR) as independent states, leading to conflict with Ukrainian government forces. Russia covertly supported the separatists with troops and weaponry, only later admitting sending "military specialists". After a year of fighting, the conflict developed into trench warfare. There were 29 failed ceasefires. About 14,000 people were killed in the war: 6,500 pro-Russian separatist and Russian forces, 4,400 Ukrainian forces, and 3,400 civilians on both sides of the frontline. The vast majority of civilian casualties were in the first year.

In April 2014, Ukraine launched a counter-offensive against pro-Russian forces, called the "Anti-Terrorist Operation" (ATO), renamed the "Joint Forces Operation" (JFO) in 2018. By late August 2014, Ukraine had re-taken most separatist-held territory and nearly regained control of the Russia–Ukraine border. In response, Russia covertly sent troops, tanks and artillery into the Donbas. Ukrainian officials called this a Russian "stealth invasion". The Russian incursion helped pro-Russian forces regain much of the territory they had lost. Alexander Borodai, former 'Prime Minister' of the DPR, said 50,000 "Russian volunteers" had fought in the first five months of the war.

Ukraine, Russia, the DPR and LPR signed a ceasefire agreement, the Minsk Protocol, in September 2014. Ceasefire breaches became rife, and heavy fighting resumed in January 2015, during which the separatists captured Donetsk Airport. A new ceasefire, Minsk II, was agreed on 12 February 2015. Immediately after, separatists renewed their offensive on Debaltseve and forced Ukraine's military to withdraw.

After the fall of Debaltseve, skirmishes continued but the front line did not change. Both sides fortified their position by building networks of trenches, bunkers and tunnels, resulting in static trench warfare. Stalemate led to the war being called a "frozen conflict", but Donbas remained a war zone, with dozens killed monthly. In 2017, on average a Ukrainian soldier died in combat every three days, with an estimated 40,000 separatist and 6,000 Russian troops in the region. By the end of 2017, OSCE observers had counted around 30,000 people in military gear crossing from Russia at the two border checkpoints it was allowed to monitor. The OSCE documented military convoys crossing from Russia covertly.

All sides agreed to a roadmap for ending the war in October 2019, but it remained unresolved. During 2021, Ukrainian fatalities rose sharply and Russian forces massed around Ukraine's borders. Russia officially recognized the DPR and LPR as independent states on 21 February 2022 and deployed troops to those territories. On 24 February, Russia began a full invasion of Ukraine, with the Donbas war subsumed into it.

Background 

Despite being recognized as an independent country since 1991, as a former USSR constituent republic, Ukraine was perceived by the leadership of Russia as part of its sphere of influence. In a 2002 paper Taras Kuzio stated "While accepting Ukrainian independence, Putin has sought to draw Ukraine into a closer relationship. This approach has been acceptable to eastern Ukrainian oligarchs, who do not harbour anti-Russian feelings and see it as perfectly natural to cooperate closely with Russia on foreign policy issues. In the 1998-2002 parliament, this translated into the creation of an inter-faction group entitled ‘To Europe with Russia’. In 2008, Russian President Vladimir Putin spoke out against Ukraine's potential membership to NATO.

In 2011 Taras Kuzio stated "The traditional Soviet policy of dividing eastern against western Ukrainians, then "bourgeois nationalists" and now "crazy Galicians," remains in place. This tactic was deliberately employed by the Yanukovych administration is promoting a strategy of regional divide-and-rule through polarization, using May 9-style provocations, to maintain its eastern Ukrainian electorate permanently mobilized. The Party of Regions has integrated left-populist paternalistic state capitalism and is perceived as supporting oligarchs. Yanukovych administration and the Party of Regions signed cooperation agreements with Vladimir Putin's Unified Russia party, the Chinese Communist Party and the Socialist group in the European Parliament"

In Feb 2014 analysts stated that Russia is able to:
 Control gas shipments to Ukraine, (in the past few years, it has twice turned off the flow of gas to the country to force the hands of Ukrainian leaders);
 Manipulate the price of gas to Ukraine’s fiscal disadvantage;
 Arbitrarily impose trade restrictions on Ukrainian exports;
 Flood Ukraine with television propaganda highlighting alleged Western interference in Ukraine’s internal affairs and the threat of fascism;
 Infiltrate Ukrainian security forces to stage provocations that would discredit the opposition (there have been persistent but unsubstantiated reports of Russian special forces being involved in kidnappings, beatings, and even sniping against the Ukrainian opposition);
 Stir up secessionist sentiment in ethnic Russian areas such as Crimea and Donetsk.

And that by all signs, the Kremlin also maintains a tight hold on Yanukovych.

Following Ukraine's Revolution of Dignity, counter-revolutionary and pro-Russian protests began in parts of the Donbas. A national survey held in March-April 2014 found that 31% of respondents in the Donbas wanted the region to separate from Ukraine, while 58% wanted autonomy within Ukraine.

While the initial protests were largely native expressions of discontent with the new Ukrainian government, Russia took advantage of them to launch a coordinated political and military campaign against Ukraine. Russian citizens led the separatist movement in Donetsk from April until August 2014, and were supported by volunteers and materiel from Russia. As the conflict escalated in May 2014, Russia employed a "hybrid approach", deploying a combination of disinformation, irregular fighters, regular Russian troops, and conventional military support to destabilize the Donbas.

History of the proxy war

March and April 2014 

Attempts to seize the Donetsk regional state administration (RSA) building began after pro-Russian protests erupted in the eastern and southern regions of Ukraine, in the wake of the Revolution of Dignity. Pro-Russian protesters occupied the Donetsk RSA from 1 to 6 March 2014, before being removed by the Security Service of Ukraine (SBU). On 6 April, 1,000–2,000 people gathered at a rally in Donetsk to demand a status referendum similar to the one held in Crimea in March.

The demonstrators stormed the RSA building, and took control of its first two floors. They said that if an extraordinary legislative session was not held by regional officials to implement a status referendum, they would take control of the regional government with a "people's mandate", and dismiss all elected regional councillors and members of parliament. As these demands were not met, the activists held a meeting in the RSA building, and voted in favour of independence from Ukraine. They proclaimed the Donetsk People's Republic (DPR) on 7 April 2014.

Unrest in Luhansk Oblast began on 6 April, when approximately 1,000 activists seized and occupied the SBU building in the city of Luhansk, following similar occupations in the cities of Donetsk and Kharkiv. Protesters barricaded the building, and demanded that all arrested separatist leaders be released. Police were able to retake control of the building, but the demonstrators regathered for a 'people's assembly' outside the building and called for a 'people's government', demanding either federalisation or incorporation into the Russian Federation. At this assembly, they elected Valery Bolotov to the position of "People's Governor".

Two referendums were announced, one on 11 May to determine whether the region should seek some form of autonomy, and a second scheduled for 18 May to determine whether the region should join the Russian Federation, or declare independence. The Luhansk People's Republic (LPR) was declared on 27 April. Representatives of the Republic demanded that the Ukrainian government provide amnesty for all protesters, enshrine Russian as an official language, and hold a referendum on the status of the region. They issued an ultimatum that stated that if Kyiv did not meet their demands by 14:00 on 29 April, they would launch an insurgency in tandem with that of the Donetsk People's Republic.

In response to the widening unrest, Acting Ukrainian President, Oleksandr Turchynov announced in his April 7th address that Ukraine would launch an "Anti-Terrorist Operation" (ATO) against separatist movements in Donetsk Oblast. On 8 April, he signed a decree authorizing the use of force to retake Donetsk administration headquarters in Donetsk city centre and "place it under state protection". The Minister of Internal Affairs, Arsen Avakov, said on 9 April that the unrest in Ukraine would be resolved within 48 hours, either through negotiations or the use of force. On 10 April, President Turchynov offered amnesty to the militants, if they laid down their arms, as well as a status referendum.

However, on 12 April, he announced that the Armed Forces of Ukraine and the National Security and Defence Council had launched a large-scale anti-terrorist operation "in the war waged by the Russian Federation against Ukraine". On the same day, unmarked pro-Russian mililtants seized the Donetsk headquarters of the Interior Ministry and two police stations without resistance, while an assault on the general prosecutor's office was repelled. Following negotiations between the militants and those in the building, the chief of the office resigned from his post. According to anonymous witnesses, some militants wore uniforms of the Berkut special police force, which had been dissolved by the new government following the February revolution. After gaining control of the Donetsk RSA and declaring the Donetsk People's Republic, pro-Russian groups vowed to fan out and take control of strategic infrastructure across Donetsk Oblast, and demanded that public officials who wish to continue their work switch allegiance to the Republic.

By 14 April, the insurgents had taken control of government buildings in many other cities within the oblast, including Sloviansk, Mariupol, Horlivka, Kramatorsk, Yenakiieve, Makiivka, Druzhkivka, and Zhdanivka. Following the seizure of the Donetsk RSA, the militants also took over the municipal administration building unopposed on 16 April, and the offices of the regional state television network on 27 April. After capturing the broadcasting centre, the militants began to broadcast Russian television channels. On April 17, Oleg Lyashko along about three thousand people took part in a patriotic rally in Donetsk, where  they held a large yellow-blue Ukrainian flag. On 4 May, the flag of the Donetsk People's Republic was raised over the federal police headquarters in Donetsk city. Novaya Gazeta concluded in 2020 that, as long Russia doesn't prosecute these "poorly prepared hooligans turning a whole region into a bloodbath", it is morally and politically responsible for all casualties.

A number of interviews given in 2019–2020 by participants on the Russian side (including Girkin, Bezler, Gubarev and others) revealed that the initial idea to take control of Donbas towns was passed on to Donetsk "People's Governor" Pavel Gubarev by Sergey Glazyev, an advisor to Russian president Vladimir Putin at that time. Gubarev's team met Girkin's as it entered Ukraine from Russia, and the original plan was to capture Shakhtarsk first, as it was much closer to both the Russo-Ukrainian border and the Russian military base in Rostov-on-Don. The decision to attack Sloviansk instead was made after Girkin's group crossed the border, supposedly due to the presence of a larger group of pro-Russian activists ready to support their cause in the town. Military and financial support for the group was partly provided by  Konstantin Malofeev.

Expansion of separatist territorial control

Sloviansk 

A group of masked pro-Russian militants under the command of retired FSB officer Igor Girkin took control of the city administration building, police offices, and SBU building in Sloviansk, a city in the northern part of Donetsk Oblast, on 12 April. After militants took over the city, Sloviansk mayor Nelya Shtepa briefly appeared at an occupied police station, and expressed support for the militants. Others gathered outside the building and similarly voiced their support for the militants. They told Ukrainian journalists who were reporting on the situation to "go back to Kyiv". Nelya Shtepa was later detained by the insurgents, and replaced by the self-proclaimed "people's mayor" Vyacheslav Ponomarev.

The militants gained control of the city's police weapons cache and seized hundreds of firearms, which prompted the Ukrainian government to launch a "counter-terrorism" operation to retake the city. This government counter-offensive began on the morning of 13 April. An entrenched standoff between pro-Russian forces and the Armed Forces of Ukraine ensued, marking the start of combat in the Donbas. The city remained under siege until 5 July, when Ukrainian forces recaptured it, with an estimated 15,000–20,000 people displaced by the fighting. Mayor Shtepa was arrested on 11 July 2014 for allegedly colluding with pro-Russian forces.

Shortly after taking control over Sloviansk, Girkin's group executed a member of town council, Volodymyr Ivanovych Rybak, as well as four other citizens of Ukraine, including 25-year-old Yuri Dyakovsky and an unnamed 19-year-old man. Girkin took responsibility for these executions in 2020, even though in the preceding years he and other pro-Russian militants had claimed Rybak had been released from custody.

Kramatorsk 

In Kramatorsk, a city in northern Donetsk Oblast, separatists attacked a police station on 12 April, resulting in a shootout. The fighters, members of the Donbas People's Militia, later captured the police station. They removed the police station's sign and raised the flag of the Donetsk People's Republic over the building. They then issued an ultimatum that stated that if the city's mayor and administration did not swear allegiance to the Republic by the following Monday, they would remove them from office. Concurrently, a crowd of demonstrators surrounded the city administration building, captured it, and raised the Donetsk People's Republic flag over it. A representative of the Republic addressed locals outside the occupied police station, but was received negatively and booed.

After a government counter-offensive as part of the "Anti-Terrorist Operation" in Donetsk Oblast on 2–3 May, the insurgents were routed from Kramatorsk's occupied SBU building. Despite this, Ukrainian troops quickly withdrew from the city for unknown reasons, and the separatists quickly regained control. Sporadic fighting continued until 5 July, when the insurgents withdrew from Kramatorsk.

Horlivka 

Militants attempted to seize the police headquarters in Horlivka on 12 April, but were halted. Ukrayinska Pravda reported that police said that the purpose of the attempted seizure was to gain access to a weapons cache. They said that they would use force if needed to defend the building from "criminals and terrorists". By 14 April militants had captured the building after a tense standoff with the police. Some members of the local police unit had defected to the Donetsk People's Republic earlier in the day, whilst the remaining officers were forced to retreat, allowing the insurgents to take control of the building.

The local chief of police was captured and badly beaten by the insurgents. A Horlivka city council deputy, Volodymyr Rybak, was kidnapped by masked men believed to be pro-Russian militants on 17 April. His body was later found in a river in occupied Sloviansk on 22 April. The city administration building was seized on 30 April, solidifying separatist control over Horlivka. Self-proclaimed mayor of Horlivka Volodymyr Kolosniuk was arrested by the SBU on suspicion of participation in "terrorist activities" on 2 July.

Mariupol 

Donetsk People's Republic activists took control of the city administration building in Mariupol on 13 April. The Ukrainian government claimed to have liberated the building on 24 April, but this was denied by locals interviewed by the BBC near the building.

Clashes between government forces and pro-Russian groups escalated in early May when the city administration building was briefly retaken by the Ukrainian National Guard. The pro-Russian forces quickly took the building back. Militants then launched an attack on a local police station, leading the Ukrainian government to send in military forces. Skirmishes between the troops and local demonstrators caused the city administration building to be set on fire. Government forces were unsuccessful in forcing out the pro-Russians, and only further inflamed tensions in Mariupol.

On 16 May, Metinvest steelworkers, along with local police and security forces, routed the insurgents from the city administration and other occupied government buildings in the city. Most insurgents left the city, and the few who remained were said to be unarmed. Despite this, the headquarters of the Donetsk People's Republic remained untouched, and pro-Russian demonstrators could still be seen outside the burnt city administration.

Ukrainian troops gained control of the city on 13 June with assistance from the National Guard. The headquarters of the DPR was captured, and Mariupol was declared the provisional capital of Donetsk Oblast, instead of Donetsk city, which was occupied by separatists.

Other cities 
Many smaller cities across the Donbas fell to the separatists.

In Artemivsk on 12 April, separatists failed to capture the local Ministry of Internal Affairs office, but instead captured the city administration building and raised the DPR flag over it. The city administration buildings in Yenakiieve and Druzhkivka were also captured. Police repelled an attack by pro-Russian militants upon an office of the Ministry of Internal Affairs in Krasnyi Lyman on 12 April, but the building was later captured by the separatists after a skirmish. Insurgents affiliated with the Donbas People's Militia occupied a regional administration building in Khartsyzk on 13 April, followed by a local administration building in Zhdanivka on 14 April.

Demonstrators hoisted the DPR flag over the city administration buildings in Krasnoarmiisk and Novoazovsk on 16 April. The local administration building in Siversk was similarly captured on 18 April. Following the takeover, local police announced that they would co-operate with the activists. On 20 April, separatists in Yenakiieve left the city administration building there, which they had occupied since 13 April. Despite this, by 27 May the city was still not under Ukrainian government control. On 22 April pro-Russian demonstrators in Kostiantynivka burned down the offices of a newspaper that had been critical of the DPR.

70 to 100 insurgents armed with assault rifles and rocket launchers attacked an armoury in Artemivsk on 24 April. The depot housed around 30 tanks. Ukrainian troops attempted to fight off the insurgents, but were forced to retreat after many men were wounded by insurgent fire. Minister of Internal Affairs Arsen Avakov said that the insurgents were led by a man with "an extensive beard". Some 30 militants seized the police headquarters in Konstantinovka on 28 April.

On 29 April, a city administration building in Pervomaisk was overrun by Luhansk People's Republic insurgents, who then raised their flag over it. The same day, militants seized control of the city administration building in Alchevsk. In Krasnyi Luch, the city administration conceded to demands by separatist activists that it support the referendums on the status of Donetsk and Luhansk of 11 May, and followed by raising the Russian flag over the city administration building.

Insurgents occupied the city administration building in Stakhanov on 1 May. Later in the week, they captured the local police station, business centre, and SBU building. Activists in Rovenky occupied a police building on 5 May, but quickly left it. On the same day, the police headquarters in Slovianoserbsk was seized by members of the Army of the South-East, affiliated with the Luhansk People's Republic. The town of Antratsyt was occupied by a number of renegade Don Cossacks. Insurgents went on to seize the prosecutor's office in Sievierodonetsk on 7 May. On the next day, supporters of the Luhansk People's Republic captured government buildings in Starobilsk.

Government counter-offensive: "the Anti-Terrorist Operation" 

Arsen Avakov, the Minister of Internal Affairs, said on 9 April that the separatist problem would be resolved within 48 hours through either negotiations or the use of force. According to the Ukrinform state news agency, he said: "There are two opposite ways for resolving this conflict – a political dialogue and the heavy-handed approach. We are ready for both." Acting president Oleksandr Turchynov had already signed a decree which called for the Donetsk regional state administration building, occupied by separatists, to be taken "under state protection". He offered amnesty to any separatists who laid down their arms and surrendered. By 11 April Prime Minister Arseniy Yatsenyuk said that he had been against the use of "law enforcement" at the time, but that "there was a limit" to how much the Ukrainian government would tolerate.

In response to the spread of separatist control throughout Donetsk Oblast and the separatists' refusal to lay down their arms, Turchynov vowed to launch a military counter-offensive operation, called the "Anti-Terrorist Operation", against insurgents in the region on 15 April. As part of the counter-offensive, Ukrainian troops re-took the airfield in Kramatorsk after a skirmish with members of the Donbas People's Militia. According to Russian media, at least four people died as a result.

After the Armed Forces of Ukraine re-took the airfield, the commanding general of the unit that had retaken it, Vasyl Krutov, was surrounded by hostile protesters who demanded to know why the Ukrainian troops had fired upon local residents. Krutov was then dragged back to the airbase along with his unit. They were then blocked by the protesters, who vowed not to let the troops leave the base. Krutov later told reporters that "if they [the separatists] do not lay down their arms, they will be destroyed".
Donbas People's Militia insurgents entered Sloviansk on 16 April, along with six armoured personnel carriers they claimed to have obtained from the Ukrainian 25th Airborne Brigade, which had surrendered in the city of Kramatorsk.

Reports say members of the brigade were disarmed after the vehicles were blocked from passing by angry locals. In another incident, several hundred residents of the village of Pchyolkino, south of Sloviansk, surrounded another column of 14 Ukrainian armoured vehicles. Following negotiations, the troops were allowed to drive their vehicles away, but only after agreeing to surrender the magazines from their assault rifles. These incidents led President Turchynov to say he would disband the 25th Airborne Brigade, although this was later cancelled. Three members of the Donbas People's Militia were killed, 11 wounded, and 63 were arrested after they attempted and failed to storm a National Guard base in Mariupol.

Turchynov relaunched the stalled counter-offensive against pro-Russian insurgents on 22 April, after two men, one a local politician, were found "tortured to death". The politician, Volodymyr Rybak, was found dead near Sloviansk after having been abducted by pro-Russian insurgents. Turchynov said that "the terrorists who effectively took the whole Donetsk Oblast hostage have now gone too far". The Internal Affairs Ministry reported that the city of Sviatohirsk, near Sloviansk, was retaken by Ukrainian troops on 23 April. In addition, the Defence Ministry said it had taken control over all points of strategic importance in the area around Kramatorsk.

The Internal Affairs Minister, Arsen Avakov, said on 24 April that Ukrainian troops had captured the city administration in Mariupol, after a clash with pro-Russian demonstrators there. Despite this, a report by the BBC said that whilst it appeared that Ukrainian troops and the mayor of Mariupol did enter the building in the early morning, Ukrainian troops had abandoned it by the afternoon. Local pro-Russian activists blamed Ukrainian nationalists for the attack upon the building but said that the DPR had regained control. A representative of the Republic, Irina Voropoyeva, said, "We, the Donetsk People's Republic, still control the building. There was an attempted provocation but now it's over."

On the same day, Ukrainian government officials said that the Armed Forces had intended to retake the city of Sloviansk, but that an increased threat of "Russian invasion" halted these operations. Russian forces had mobilised within  of the Ukrainian border. The officials said that seven troops were killed during the day's operations. President Turchynov issued a statement later in the day, and said that the "Anti-Terrorist Operation" would be resumed, citing the ongoing hostage crisis in Sloviansk as a reason. By 6 May, 14 Ukrainian troops had died and 66 had been injured in the fighting.

Early in the morning on 7 May, the National Guard retook the city administration in Mariupol after heavy fighting with insurgents overnight. Anti-government demonstrators said that government forces had used tear gas during the operation, resulting in injuries when the demonstrators tried to re-occupy the building after the National Guard withdrew. By the morning of 7 May, the flag of the DPR was once again flying over the building.

Ukrainian troops launched another attack on insurgents in Mariupol on 9 May. During an assault on an occupied police building, that building was set alight by government forces, causing the insurgents to flee. Arsen Avakov said that 60 insurgents attacked the police building, not Ukrainian troops and that the police and other government forces had managed to repel the insurgents. Between six and twenty militants were killed, along with one police officer. Four militants were captured, and five policemen were wounded.

One armoured personnel carrier was captured by pro-Russian protesters during the fighting. After the clashes, pro-Russian forces built barricades across the city centre. Concurrently, Ukrainian National News said that separatists attempted to disarm Ukrainian troops near Donetsk. The troops resisted by firing warning shots, and arresting 100 of the separatists. Also, an unnamed Ukrainian Orthodox Church (Moscow Patriarchate) priest attempted to negotiate with separatists near Druzhkivka, but was later killed after being shot eight times. This was confirmed by the Church and the Prosecutor's Office.

May 2014: post-referendum fighting 

It was reported on 12 May that, following the local autonomy referendum, the Donbas People's Militia leader Igor Girkin declared himself "Supreme Commander" of the Donetsk People's Republic. In his decree, he demanded that all military stationed in the region swear an oath of allegiance to him within 48 hours, and said that all remaining Ukrainian military in the region would be "destroyed on the spot". He then petitioned the Russian Federation for military support to protect against "the threat of intervention by NATO" and "genocide". Pavel Gubarev, president of Donetsk People's Republic, instituted martial law on 15 May, and vowed for "total annihilation" of Ukrainian forces if they did not pull out of the Donbas by 21:00. Similarly, the president of the Luhansk People's Republic, Valery Bolotov, declared martial law on 22 May.

The Donetsk-based steel magnate Rinat Akhmetov called on his 300,000 employees within the Donetsk region to "rally against separatists" on 20 May. Sirens sounded at noon at his factories to signal the beginning of the rally. A so-called "Peace March" was held in the Donbas Arena in Donetsk city, accompanied by cars sounding their horns at noon. BBC News and Ukrayinska Pravda reported that some vehicles were attacked by separatists, and that gunmen had warned the offices of several city taxi services not to take part.

In response to Akhmetov's refusal to pay taxes to the Donetsk People's Republic, on 20 May the chairman of the State Council of the DPR, Denis Pushilin, announced that the Republic would attempt to nationalise Akhmetov's assets. On 25 May, between 2,000 and 5,000 protesters marched to Akhmetov's mansion in Donetsk city, and demanded the nationalisation of Akhmetov's property, while chanting "Akhmetov is an enemy of the people!".

18 soldiers were killed during an insurgent attack upon an army checkpoint near the city of Volnovakha, on 22 May. Three armoured personnel carriers and several lorries were destroyed in the attack, whilst one insurgent was killed. On the same day, a convoy consisting of 100 soldiers attempted to cross a bridge at Rubizhne, Luhansk Oblast, and advance into insurgent-held territory. They were ambushed by a group of between 300 and 500 insurgents. After fighting that lasted throughout the day, the soldiers were forced to retreat. Between two and fourteen soldiers and between seven and twenty insurgents were killed during the fighting. Three army infantry combat vehicles and one lorry were destroyed, and another three armoured vehicles were captured by the insurgents. The Internal Affairs Ministry stated that some insurgents had attempted to enter Luhansk Oblast from Russia, but had been repelled by border guards.

Following a declaration by Pavel Gubarev establishing the "New Russia Party" on 22 May, representatives of the Donetsk and Luhansk republics signed an agreement creating the confederative state of New Russia. Separatists planned to incorporate most of Ukraine's southern and eastern regions into the new confederation, including the key cities of Kharkiv, Kherson, Dnipropetrovsk, Mykolaiv, Zaporizhzhia and Odesa. The declaration signed established the position of Russian Orthodoxy as the state religion and an intention to nationalise key industries.

A unit of the pro-government Donbas Battalion volunteer paramilitary attempted to advance on a separatist checkpoint near the village of Karlivka, northwest of Donetsk city, on 23 May. They were ambushed by a group of between 150 and 200 separatists, supported by one of the captured armoured personnel carriers. The pro-government paramilitary was surrounded by the separatists, and outnumbered six to one until fighters affiliated with the nationalist Right Sector broke through the separatist lines to allow some members of the group to escape.

Five members of the Donbas Battalion were killed, along with four separatists. Twenty members of the pro-government paramilitaries were wounded, and at least four were captured. The involvement of Right Sector was disputed by the leadership of the Donbas Battalion. Pro-Russian leader Igor Bezler said that he executed all of the captured paramilitaries. Another separatist leader confirmed four of their fighters were killed, and also said that ten pro-government paramilitaries and two civilians died. During the same day, two pro-Russian separatists were killed during an assault by the pro-government "Ukraine Battalion" paramilitary on an occupied local government building in Torez.

Airport battle and fighting in Luhansk 

On the morning of 26 May 200 pro-Russian insurgents, including members of the Vostok Battalion, captured the main terminal of the Donetsk International Airport, erected roadblocks around it, and demanded that government forces withdraw. Soon after these demands were issued, the Ukrainian National Guard issued an ultimatum to the separatists, asking them to surrender. This was subsequently rejected. Government forces then launched an assault on separatist positions at the airport with paratroopers and airstrikes. Attack helicopters were used by government forces. They targeted a separatist-operated anti-aircraft gun.
An estimated 40 insurgents died in the fighting, with some civilians caught in the crossfire.
Between 15 and 35 insurgents were killed in a single friendly-fire incident, when two lorries carrying wounded fighters away from the airport were ambushed by insurgents mistaking them for Ukrainian forces.

During the fighting at the airport, Druzhba Arena in Donetsk city was ransacked by pro-Russian insurgents, who looted the building and destroyed surveillance equipment, and set it ablaze. Concurrently, Donetsk police said the insurgents had killed two policemen in the nearby town of Horlivka. The Moscow Times reported that the two men had been executed for "breaking their oath to the Donetsk People's Republic".

Luhansk People's Republic-affiliated insurgents attacked a Ukrainian National Guard unit in the early hours of 28 May.

Escalation in May and June 2014 
Mykhailo Koval, the Minister of Defence, said on 30 May that Ukrainian government forces had "completely cleared" the insurgents from the southern and western parts of Donetsk Oblast and the northern part of Luhansk Oblast. Meanwhile, an internal coup replaced the leadership of the Donetsk People's Republic, and some bodies of Russian fighters killed in the airport battle were repatriated to Russia.

Luhansk border post siege 

Two separatists were killed in a skirmish with Ukrainian border guards on 31 May. Two days later, five separatists were killed when 500 separatists attacked a border post in Luhansk Oblast. Eleven border guards and eight separatists were wounded during the fighting, which also killed one civilian.

2 June Luhansk airstrike 
On 2 June, eight people were killed and more than 20 wounded by a series of explosions hitting the occupied RSA building in Luhansk city. Separatists blamed the incident on a government airstrike, while Ukrainian officials denied this, and claimed that the explosions were caused by a stray surface-to-air missile fired by insurgents. The Organization for Security and Co-operation in Europe (OSCE) published a report on the next day, stating that based on "limited observation", they believed that the explosion was caused by an airstrike, supporting separatist claims.

A CNN investigation found clear evidence that the attack came from the air and the pattern of the craters suggested use of standard equipment on the Su-25, a ground-attack fighter, and the Su-27 – both combat aircraft operated by Ukraine.
Radio Liberty also concluded that "Despite Denials, All Evidence For Deadly Explosion Points To Kyiv". CNN said that it was the first time that civilians had been killed in an attack by the Ukrainian air force during the 2014 pro-Russian unrest in the Donbas. The next day, Luhansk People's Republic declared a three-day mourning in the city.

Continued fighting

Government forces destroyed a separatist stronghold in Semenivka, and regained control of Krasnyi Lyman on 3 June. Two soldiers were killed in the fighting, and forty-five were wounded. A spokesman for the Armed Forces of Ukraine said that 300 insurgents were killed during the operation and that 500 were wounded. Insurgents said they lost between 10 and 50 men. They said that at least 25 were killed while in hospital at Krasnyi Lyman. None of these reports were independently confirmed, and both sides denied the other's accounts of the battle.

On the next day, insurgents captured the besieged Luhansk border post, as well as a National Guard base near Luhansk city. The fighting in these areas left six insurgents dead, and three government soldiers wounded. Another border post was captured by the insurgents in Sverdlovsk. The National Guard base fell after guardsmen ran out of ammunition. Separatists had earlier seized vast quantities of munitions from the captured border post.

Another border post was attacked on 5 June, in the village of Marynivka. Government officials said that between 15 and 16 insurgents were killed and that five soldiers were injured as well. A shootout between rival separatist groups in Donetsk city took place on 7 June, near the Donetsk RSA. The vice-president of the Donetsk People's Republic, Maxim Petrukhin, was killed in the fighting, and president Denis Pushilin was wounded.

Russian tank incursion 
Ukrainian officials said that Russia had allowed tanks to cross the Russo-Ukrainian border into Donetsk Oblast on 11 June. Internal Affairs Minister Arsen Avakov said "we have observed columns passing with armoured personnel carriers, other armoured vehicles and artillery pieces, and tanks which, according to our information, came across the border and this morning were in Snizhne". He continued by saying Ukrainian forces had destroyed part of the column, and that fighting was still under way. Reuters correspondents confirmed the presence of three tanks in Donetsk city, and the US State Department's Bureau of Intelligence and Research also said that Russia had indeed sent tanks, along with other heavy weapons, to the separatists in Ukraine.

The weapons sent are said to have included: a column of three T-64 tanks, several BM-21 Grad multiple rocket launchers, and other military vehicles. "Russia will claim these tanks were taken from Ukrainian forces, but no Ukrainian tank units have been operating in that area," the State Department said in a statement. "We are confident that these tanks came from Russia." The newly elected Ukrainian president Petro Poroshenko said that it was "unacceptable" for tanks to cross into Ukraine. Russia called the reports "another fake piece of information." Nevertheless, the three tanks were later spotted moving through Makiivka and Torez, flying the flag of the Russian Federation. Insurgents confirmed that they had obtained three tanks, but leaders refused to elaborate on how they acquired them; one militant told reporters that they originated "from a military warehouse".

The president of the DPR, Denis Pushilin, stated that the three tanks would be stationed in Donetsk city and that they gave his forces "at least some hope of defending [Donetsk] because heavy weapons are already being used against us." Konstantin Mashovets, a former Ukrainian Defence Ministry official, said the tanks had likely been seized by Russian forces in Crimea before making their way into mainland Ukraine. Anton Heraschenko, an advisor to Arsen Avakov, confirmed at a briefing in Kyiv that the tanks were once in the possession of the Armed Forces of Ukraine in Crimea, and that they had been transferred by sea to Russia before crossing the border into Ukraine.

On the day after the tank incursion, three soldiers were killed when they were ambushed by insurgents in Stepanivka. Heavy fighting resumed during the morning of 13 June, when the government launched a new attack against insurgents in Mariupol. Ukrainian troops managed to recapture the city, and declared it the "provisional capital" of Donetsk Oblast until the government regains control over Donetsk city. Meanwhile, an agreement between the Minister of Internal Affairs, Arsen Avakov, and the president of the DPR, Denis Pushilin, meant to create a ceasefire and allow civilians to escape the violence in Sloviansk, failed with both sides blaming each other for launching new attacks. During the next morning, a convoy of border guardsmen was attacked by insurgents while passing Mariupol, leaving at least five of the guardsmen dead.

Ilyushin Il-76 shoot-down 

A Ukrainian Air Force Ilyushin Il-76MD was shot down by forces aligned with the Luhansk People's Republic on 14 June. The aircraft was preparing to land at Luhansk International Airport, and was carrying troops and equipment from an undisclosed location. All 49 people on board died. Meanwhile, two T-72 tanks entered Donetsk, and a skirmish erupted at a military checkpoint in Luhansk, lasting two days.

Battle of Yampil 
Late on 19 June, a battle fought with tanks and armoured vehicles broke out in the town of Yampil, near government-held Krasnyi Lyman. Up to 4,000 insurgents were present for the fighting, which started, according to the insurgents, after the Armed Forces attempted to capture insurgent-held Yampil, with the goal of breaking through to Siversk. According to the Armed Forces, it started after insurgents attempted to break through a cordon of government troops around government-held Krasny Lyman. The battle was described as exceeding "in terms of force and scale anything there has been" during the conflict in the Donbas.

The Armed Forces deployed both air and artillery strikes in their attempts to rout the insurgents. The battle continued into the next day. Overnight, between 7 and 12 soldiers were killed and between 25 and 30 were wounded. The Armed Forces said they killed 300 insurgents, but this was not independently verified, the separatists confirmed only two deaths and seven wounded on their side. The insurgents also said they destroyed one tank, several BMD-1s, and also shot down a Su-25 bomber.

The Ukrainian military said that they had gained control of Yampil and Siversk on 20 June 20 hours before a unilateral ceasefire by Ukrainian forces, as part of Ukrainian president Petro Poroshenko's 15-point peace plan. They also acknowledged that there was still heavy fighting in the area around Yampil, and the village of Zakitne. By this point, the number of soldiers killed in the battle had reached 13. During the continued fighting, militants blew up a bridge over a river in the village of Zakitne.

July 2014: post-ceasefire government offensive 

After a week-long ceasefire unilaterally declared by Ukrainian president Petro Poroshenko ended, the Armed Forces renewed their operations against the insurgents on 1 July. Shelling occurred in Kramatorsk and Sloviansk, and government forces retook a border crossing in Dolzhansk, one of the three major border crossings occupied by the separatists. Government forces also recaptured the villages of Brusivka and Stary Karavan. On the same day, insurgents in Luhansk said that they had taken control of Luhansk International Airport. On 1 July 2014 in Donetsk a street gunfight broke between rival factions of pro-Russian militants, which resulted in one person being fatally wounded and two others in critical conditions.

Internal Affairs Ministry spokesman Zoryan Shkyriakuk said that over 1,000 pro-Russian insurgents were killed in the first day following the resumption of hostilities. Liga.net, citing a source involved with the government military operation, reported that over 400 insurgents were killed in action, but that the higher figures reported earlier could not be confirmed. Separatists themselves reported only two deaths in fighting at Mykolaivka.

Insurgents attacked a border post in Novoazovsk on 2 July. During the attack, mortars were fired upon the post, and clashes broke out. One border guard was killed in the fighting, and another eight guardsmen were injured. Government forces recaptured the town of Mykolaivka, near Sloviansk, on 4 July. A group of DPR-affiliated militants defected as a result, and joined the Ukrainian army.

In a further blow to the insurgents, government forces retook the stronghold of Sloviansk on 5 July. Commander of the DPR insurgents, Igor Girkin, took the decision "due to the overwhelming numerical superiority of the enemy", according to DPR prime minister Alexander Borodai. He said that DPR forces had retreated to Kramatorsk, but BBC News reported that they were seen abandoning their checkpoints in Kramatorsk. Later that day, Borodai confirmed that the insurgents had abandoned "the entire northern sector", including Kramatorsk, and had retreated to Donetsk city. After the retreat of Girkin's forces to Donetsk, he assumed control of the DPR, replacing the previous authorities there in what was described as a "coup d'état".

Subsequently, Ukraine's Armed Forces recaptured Druzhkivka, Kostyantynivka, and Artemivsk. Amidst the insurgent retreat, Donetsk city mayor Oleksandr Lukyanchenko said that at least 30,000 people had left the city since April. In a separate development, Ukrainian forces said they spotted two aerial drones in Mariupol, and shot one of them down.

Ahead of a planned government offensive on the insurgent-occupied city of Donetsk, key roads leading into the city were blocked on 7 July. Insurgents destroyed railway bridges over the roads, causing them to collapse and block the roads. Defence Minister Valeriy Heletey stated on 8 July that there would be "no more unilateral ceasefires", and said dialogue was only possible if the insurgents laid down their weapons. More fighting broke out at Luhansk International Airport on 9 July. LPR-affiliated insurgents said that they had captured the airport on 1 July, but the Ukrainian army managed to maintain control over it. More than 10,000 households in Luhansk Oblast were without gas service due to damage to gas lines, according to a statement on the same day by the regional gas supplier.

Clashes at the Donetsk International Airport continued on 10 July. Insurgents fired mortars at the airport, and attempted to recapture it, but were repelled by the Armed Forces. Ukrainian forces also retook the city of Siversk, which was confirmed by the insurgents. On the same day, the Luhansk city administration reported that six civilians had been injured due to ongoing hostilities across the city. There were also reports of factionalism among the separatists, with some desertions. According to these reports, the Vostok Battalion had rejected the authority of Igor Girkin. Alexander Borodai, prime minister of the DPR, denied these reports, however, and said that they were lies.

Heavy fighting continued in Luhansk Oblast on 11 July. On that day, an Armed Forces column travelling near Rovenky was attacked by an insurgent-operated Grad rocket lorry. An air strike launched by the Armed Forces eventually managed to destroy the rocket launcher, but only after 23 soldiers were killed. In response to the attack, Ukrainian president Poroshenko said that "For every life of our soldiers, the militants will pay with tens and hundreds of their own". On the next day, the Ukrainian Air Force launched air strikes targeting insurgent positions across Donetsk and Luhansk oblasts. The Ukrainian government said that 500 insurgents were killed in these strikes, which they said were retaliations for the separatist rocket attack on the previous day. Four people were killed at Marinka, a western suburb of Donetsk city, after rockets struck an insurgent-held area of the city. The Ukrainian government and separatists blamed each other for the attack.

Fighting worsens in eastern Donetsk Oblast 

After a brief lull following the insurgent withdrawal from the northern part of Donetsk Oblast, fighting continued to escalate sharply in the eastern parts of Donetsk Oblast. Shells landed on the border town of Donetsk in Rostov Oblast, a part of Russia, on 13 July. One civilian was killed in the shelling. Russian officials blamed the Armed Forces of Ukraine for the shelling, whilst Ukraine denied responsibility and accused insurgents in the Donbas of having staged a false flag attack. Russia said it was considering launching airstrikes against government targets in Ukraine as retaliation for the shelling.

Ukrainian forces went on to make gains around Luhansk, ending an insurgent blockade of Luhansk International Airport. LPR officials acknowledged that they lost 30 men during fighting in the village of Oleksandrivka. The insurgent-occupied town of Snizhne was hit by rockets fired from an aeroplane on 15 July, leaving at least 11 people dead, and destroying multiple homes. The insurgents blamed the Air Force of Ukraine, but the Ukrainian government denied any involvement in the attack.

Clashes broke out between insurgents and the Armed Forces along the border with Russia in Shakhtarsk Raion on 16 July. Insurgents who had been holed up in the town of Stepanivka made an attempt to escape encirclement by government forces at 05:00. According to a report by the National Guard, a roadblock near the border village of Marynivka was attacked by the insurgents with tanks, mortar fire, and anti-tank missiles. The checkpoint was shelled for over an hour, causing significant damage to infrastructure in Marynivka. Guardsmen managed to repel the attack, and forced the insurgents back to Stepanivka, where fighting continued. The battle then moved to the nearby village of Tarany. At least 11 Ukrainian soldiers died in the fighting. Attempts to form a "contact group" between the insurgents and the Ukrainian government, part of President Poroshenko's "15-point peace plan", failed, leaving little hope of a renewed ceasefire. The insurgents later said that they successfully retook Marynivka from the Armed Forces.

Downing of Malaysia Airlines Flight 17 

On 17 July 2014, DPR forces shot down a civilian passenger jet, Malaysia Airlines Flight 17 over Hrabove (a village in the Donetsk Oblask), killing all 298 people on board. This disaster followed two similar incidents earlier in the week, when two Ukrainian Air Force planes were shot down.

DPR-affiliated insurgents blamed the Ukrainian government for the disaster, whereas the government, Netherlands, and Australia blamed Russia and the insurgents. The responsibility for investigation was delegated to the Dutch Safety Board (DSB) and the Dutch-led joint investigation team (JIT), who concluded that the airliner was downed by a Buk surface-to-air missile launched from pro-Russian separatist-controlled territory in Ukraine. According to the JIT, the Buk that was used originated from the 53rd Anti-Aircraft Missile Brigade of the Russian Federation, and had been transported from Russia on the day of the crash, fired from a field in a separatist-controlled area, and the launcher returned to Russia after it was used to shoot down MH17.

On the basis of the JIT's conclusions, the governments of the Netherlands and Australia held Russia responsible for the deployment of the Buk installation and took steps to hold Russia formally accountable.

Government push into Donetsk and Luhansk cities 
Meanwhile, fighting in Luhansk resulted in the loss of electrical power and water services across the city. Shelling damaged an electrical substation in the Kamennobrodskiy district, causing the power loss. An oil refinery in Lysychansk was also set alight.

At least 20 civilians were killed in the shelling of Luhansk, according to a statement by the city administration. The statement said that a barrage of rockets hit "virtually every district". The shelling forced OSCE monitors to flee from their office in Luhansk, and move to Starobilsk. Government forces went on to capture the south-eastern section of the city. Another 16 people died overnight, and at least 60 were wounded. According to a government report, Luhansk airport was secured by government forces amidst the battle.
Heavy fighting also resumed around Donetsk airport overnight, and explosions were heard in all districts of the city. The city fell quiet by 09:00 on 19 July. By 21 July, heavy fighting in Donetsk had begun again. Donetsk was rocked by explosions, and heavy weapons fire caused smoke to rise over the city. Fighting was concentrated in the northwestern districts of Kyivskyi and Kuibyshevskyi, and also near the central railway station and airport, leading local residents to seek refuge in bomb shelters, or to flee the city. The city's water supply was cut off during the fighting, and all railway and bus service was stopped. The streets emptied, and insurgents erected barricades across the city to control traffic. The cities of Dzerzhynsk, Soledar, and Rubizhne were also recaptured by government forces.

The suburb of Mayorsk, just outside Horlivka, and the city of Sievierodonetsk, in Luhansk Oblast, were recaptured by the Armed Forces on 22 July. OSCE monitors visiting Donetsk following the previous day's fighting there said that the city was "practically deserted", and that the fighting had stopped. On the same day, DPR prime minister Alexander Borodai said that he wanted to resume ceasefire talks. DPR commander Igor Girkin also said "The time has come when Russia must take a final decision – to really support Donbas's Russians or abandon them forever". Also, the pro-Ukrainian paramilitary Donbas Battalion captured Popasna.

After having retaken Sievierodonetsk, government forces fought insurgents around the neighbouring city of Lysychansk. An insurgent car bomb killed three soldiers during the fighting there. Grad rocket attacks were launched against government forces garrisoned at Vesela Hora, Kamysheve, and also Luhansk airport. The press centre for the government military operation said that situation remained "most complex" in the areas around "Donetsk city, Luhansk city, Krasnodon and Popasna". Government forces broke through the insurgent blockade around Donetsk airport on 23 July and then advanced into the northwestern corner of Donetsk city.

Subsequently, the insurgents withdrew from many areas on the outskirts of the city, including Karlivka, and the area around Donetsk airport. Insurgent commander Igor Girkin said that this was done to fortify Donetsk city centre, and also to avoid being encircled by government forces. He also said that he did not expect a government incursion into Donetsk city centre. Meanwhile, clashes continued in Shakhtarsk Raion, along the border with Russia. Amidst the fighting, two Ukrainian Su-25 fighter jets that had been providing air support to ground forces near Dmytrivka were shot down by the insurgents.

On July 24 government forces recaptured Lysychansk. On the same day, fighting raged around Horlivka. Government forces launched air and artillery strikes on insurgents within the city, and clashes were fought all around it. One important bridge collapsed in the fighting, severing a critical route out of the city. People fled the violence in cars and on foot. Despite these advances by the Armed Forces, the border with Russia was not secured. Izvaryne border post in Luhansk Oblast, which is controlled by the Army of the South-East, was reported to be the main entry point for weapons and reinforcements from Russia. Shelling began again in the Kyivskyi, Kirovskyi and Petrovskyi districts of Donetsk city. According to Donetsk city administration, 11 houses were damaged in Petrovsky, and at least one man was injured. The fighting continued overnight into 26 July, with explosions, shelling, and shooting heard across the city.

During the third day of the government's offensive on the insurgent-stronghold of Horlivka, between 20 and 30 civilians were killed on 27 July. Horlivka was virtually abandoned, with electric power and water cut off. Shelling damaged or destroyed many buildings, including a hospital, greengrocer's, and energy company office. Ukrainian troops also entered the town of Shakhtarsk, fought the insurgents that had been occupying it, and captured it around 14:30. This cut off the supply corridor between the territories held by the DPR and LPR, isolating insurgents in Donetsk city.

Skirmishes also broke out in the nearby towns of Snizhne and Torez. The intense combat across Shakhtarsk Raion forced a party of Dutch and Australian policemen to call off an attempt to investigate the crash site of Malaysia Airlines Flight 17. 41 Ukrainian soldiers deserted their posts and went to the insurgent-controlled Izvaryne border crossing, where they told insurgents that they refused to fight against their "own people". The insurgents allowed them to flee Ukraine, and cross into Russia. By 28 July, the strategic heights of Savur-Mohyla were under Ukrainian control, along with the town of Debaltseve.

Insurgents had previously used Savur-Mohyla to shell Ukrainian troops around the town of Marynivka. By 29 July, a further 17 civilians had been killed in the fighting, along with an additional 43 people injured. Shelling continued in the Leninskyi and Kyivskyi districts of Donetsk city. According to the city administration, these districts were heavily damaged.

According to a report by National Security and Defence Council of Ukraine, crossing points on the border with Russia were attacked from Russian territory at least 153 times since 5 June. 27 border guardsmen were killed in these attacks, and 185 were injured. Government forces made a further advance on 30 July, when they evicted insurgents from Avdiivka, near Donetsk airport. Military operations were paused on 31 July. This was meant to allow international experts to examine the crash site of Malaysia Airlines Flight 17, which is located in Shakhtarsk Raion, where the fiercest battles had been taking place on the previous few days. Monitors were escorted to the site by the Armed Forces of Ukraine.

After fighting severed various transmission lines, Luhansk city lost all access to electrical power. Little fuel remained to power emergency generators. Minor skirmishes occurred in Vasylivka and Zhovtneve. Meanwhile, talks between the separatists, Russia, Ukraine, and the OSCE were held in Minsk. Fighting continued in Shakhtarsk. An ambush by the insurgents on government forces there resulted in the deaths of ten soldiers. 11 went missing, and 13 were wounded. A government offensive on the city of Pervomaisk in Luhansk Oblast continued.

Following a series of military defeats, Igor Girkin, insurgent commander for the DPR, urged Russian military intervention, and said that the combat inexperience of his irregular forces, along with recruitment difficulties amongst the local population in Donetsk Oblast had caused the setbacks. He addressed Russian president Vladimir Putin, saying that "Losing this war on the territory that President Vladimir Putin personally named New Russia would threaten the Kremlin's power and, personally, the power of the president". Government forces closed in on Luhansk and Donetsk cities on 3 August.

A number of civilians were killed in fighting in both cities. Luhansk was reported to be "virtually surrounded", with little electrical power or water supply available. The situation in the city of Donetsk was less dire, as trains to Russia were still running, but fighting and shelling did not relent. According to the Armed Forces, three-quarters of the territory once held by the insurgents had been recaptured. They also said that they had completely cut off supply lines between the DPR and LPR, after more than a week of fighting in Shakhtarsk Raion.

After a prolonged battle, the Armed Forces recaptured the vital town of Yasynuvata on 4 August. At least five soldiers died in the fighting to capture the town, which is a strategic railway junction on the main road between Donetsk and Luhansk cities. The pro-government paramilitary Azov and Shakhtarsk battalions said that they had advanced into Donetsk city, and had begun to "liberate" it. The Ukrainian government said that all civilians should evacuate from Donetsk, and issued statements asking DPR and LPR forces to help establish "humanitarian corridors" to allow civilians in Donetsk, Luhansk and Horlivka to flee. Commenting on the situation in Luhansk, mayor Sergei Kravchenko said "As a result of the blockade and ceaseless rocket attacks, the city is on the verge of a humanitarian catastrophe".

As government troops pushed into Donetsk on 5 August, heavy fighting erupted at 17:00 in the Petrovskyi district of the city. Elsewhere, insurgents recaptured the town of Yasynuvata after a retreat by government forces. A spokesman from the National Security and Defence Council of Ukraine said that the Armed Forces left the town to avoid harming the "peaceful population", and that the city was being evacuated so that it could be "completely liberated". He also said that the railway station remained under government control, and that all railway traffic had been blocked. Fighting between insurgents and government forces across the Donbas region continued "constantly" over the course of the day.

Fighting and shelling continued around Donetsk on 8 August, with several civilians killed or injured. By 9 August, insurgent commander Igor Girkin said that Donetsk had been "completely encircled" by government forces. This followed the capture of the vital town of Krasnyi Luch by the government, after insurgent-aligned Cossacks stationed there fled. Further skirmishes between insurgents and the Armed Forces took place in Mnohopillia, Stepanivka, Hryhorivka, Krasny Yar, Pobeda, Shyshkove, Komyshne, Novohannivka, Krasna Talivka, Dmytrivka, Sabivka, and Luhansk airport.

Overnight and into 10 August, government forces launched an artillery barrage on Donetsk city. According to a spokesman for the Armed Forces, insurgents began to flee the city during the barrage, and were in a state of "panic and chaos". Hospitals and residential buildings were heavily damaged, and many remaining residents took shelter in basements. The cities of Pervomaisk, Kalynove, Komyshuvakha, in western Luhansk Oblast near Popasna, were captured by government forces on 12 August after heavy fighting. Heavy shelling of Donetsk continued into 14 August.

During this artillery barrage, Igor Girkin resigned from his post as commander of the insurgent forces of the Donetsk People's Republic. He was replaced by Vladimir Kononov, who is known by the nom de guerre Tsar. Girkin's resignation, along with the 7 August resignation of DPR prime minister Alexander Borodai (who was replaced by Alexander Zakharchenko), represented a shift in the nature of the conflict. Given the recent military failings of the DPR and the LPR, Russia decided that it could no longer rely on a patchwork of irregular fighters in the Donbas, and ordered a change in leadership. It abandoned the separatist project, and replaced it with the idea of federalisation of Donbas within Ukraine. To effect this change, it would soon switch gears from hybrid warfare to conventional warfare.

History as an open war between Russia and Ukraine

August 2014 invasion by Russian forces 

On 14 August, a convoy of some two dozen armoured personnel carriers and other vehicles with official Russian military plates crossed into Ukraine near the insurgent-controlled Izvaryne border crossing. NATO Secretary General Anders Fogh Rasmussen confirmed that a "Russian incursion" into Ukraine had occurred. Ukrainian president Petro Poroshenko said that Ukrainian artillery engaged and destroyed a "significant" portion of the armoured column. The Russian Defence Ministry denied the existence of any such convoy. Following this incident, the newly appointed prime minister of the DPR Alexander Zakharchenko said that his forces included 1,200 Russian-trained combatants.

A Ukrainian Air Force MiG-29 fighter jet was shot down by the insurgents in Luhansk Oblast on 17 August. Ten civilians were killed during continued shelling in Donetsk. The insurgent-occupied city of Horlivka was encircled by the Armed Forces on 18 August. Government forces also advanced into the edges of Luhansk city. A convoy of refugees from Luhansk was hit by Grad rockets near the village of Novosvitlivka. Dozens of civilians died in the attack, which the National Security and Defence Council of Ukraine blamed on the insurgents. Insurgents denied attacking any refugee convoys. DPR prime minister Aleksandr Zakharchenko stated that if the Ukrainian government made "reasonable proposals to lay down arms, close borders, we will talk on equal terms as equal partners". He added, however, that the government "must recognise us as a state, now it is already impossible to ask for a certain degree of autonomy".

After having edged into Luhansk city on 18 August, government forces began to advance through the city "block by block" on 19 August. Fighting was heard in streets across the city, and shelling of many insurgent-occupied districts continued. There was also fighting Makiivka and Ilovaisk, two cities just outside Donetsk city. A spokesman for the Internal Affairs Ministry said that government forces were "clearing" Ilovaisk of insurgents, and later captured most of the city. The headquarters of the DPR in Donetsk city were also shelled. Fighting across Donetsk Oblast on 19 August resulted in the deaths of 34 civilians. By early evening on 20 August, government forces said that they had recaptured "significant parts" of the city of Luhansk, after a series of running battles in streets throughout the day.

By 25 August, an insurgent counter-offensive had stalled the government's offensive on Donetsk and Luhansk cities. Insurgents attacked government positions in Shchastia, and along the Siverskyi Donets River in Luhansk Oblast. As this attack occurred, insurgents in Luhansk received reinforcements. Government forces near Ilovaisk and Amvrosiivka in Donetsk Oblast became surrounded by insurgents, after their attempt to take Ilovaisk was halted by heavy shelling. The pro-government volunteer Donbas Battalion, trapped in the city for days by the insurgents, accused the Ukrainian government and Armed Forces of "abandoning" them.

Other volunteer battalions, such as the Azov and Dnipro, left Ilovaisk after encountering heavy resistance. Donbas Battalion leader Semen Semenchenko said "I think it is profitable for the defence ministry not to send help, but to achieve a situation where volunteer battalions start blaming each other about who helped who".

A column of armoured vehicles crossed into Ukraine from Russia near Novoazovsk on 25 August. There had been no insurgent formations within  of this area for many weeks. Heavy fighting took place in the village of Markyne,  from Novoazovsk. Insurgents used the village as a base to shell Novoazovsk. A spokesman for the National Security and Defence Council of Ukraine said that the entrance of the column into Ukraine was an attempt "by the Russian military in the guise of Donbas fighters to open a new area of military confrontation".

According to the Mariupol city website, the Dnipro and Donbas battalions repelled the attack, and the "invaders" retreated to the border. Russian Foreign Minister Sergei Lavrov said he had no knowledge of the incident, and suggested that reports of the incident being an incursion by Russian forces were "disinformation." Directly prior to the appearance of the column, the area was heavily shelled. The nearest insurgent artillery positions were beyond the range of this area.

Villagers from Kolosky in Starobesheve Raion told Reuters that military men with Russian accents and no identifying insignias had appeared in the village at the weekend of 23–24 August. They set up a roadblock near the village. The men wore distinctive white armbands. The villagers referred to them as "little green men", a term that was used to refer to the irregular Russian forces that took control of Crimea from February 2014. Following the appearance of these men, ten soldiers in green military uniforms with white armbands were detained by Ukrainian forces at Dzerkalne.

The Russian military confirmed that these men were Russian paratroopers and that they had been captured. The Russian Defence Ministry said the men had entered Ukraine "by mistake during an exercise". The Security Service of Ukraine (SBU) released videos that they said were interviews with the captive Russian soldiers. In one of the videos, a soldier said that their commanders had sent them on a  march "without explaining its purpose or warning that they would be in Ukrainian territory, where they were apprehended by Ukrainian forces and surrendered without a fight".

Insurgents pushed into Novoazovsk on 27 August. Whilst the Ukrainian government said they were in "total control" of Novoazovsk, town mayor Oleg Sidorkin confirmed that the insurgents had captured it. He also said that "dozens" of tanks and armoured vehicles had been used by the insurgents in their assault on the town. At least four civilians were injured by insurgent shelling. To the north, close to Starobesheve, Ukrainian forces said that they spotted a column of 100 armoured vehicles, tanks, and Grad rocket lorries that was heading south, toward Novoazovsk. They said these vehicles were marked with "white circles or triangles", similar to the white armbands seen on the captured Russian paratroopers earlier in the week. Amidst pressure on this new third front, government forces retreated westward toward Mariupol.

They evacuated the town of Starobesheve, among other areas in the  stretch of borderland from the Sea of Azov to the existing insurgent-held territories. A report by The New York Times described the retreating soldiers as "exhausted, filthy and dismayed". Western officials described the new insurgent actions as a "stealth invasion" by the Russian Federation, with tanks, artillery and infantry said to have crossed into Ukraine from Russian territory. US State Department spokesman Jen Psaki said that "these incursions indicate a Russian-directed counteroffensive is likely underway", and Ukrainian president Petro Poroshenko said "An invasion of Russian forces has taken place". A statement by the National Security and Defence Council of Ukraine (NSDC) later said that Novoazovsk had been captured by "Russian troops", despite earlier denials by the Ukrainian government.

According to the NSDC, Ukrainian troops withdrew from Novoazovsk to save lives, and were instead preparing defences in Mariupol. Meanwhile, fighting continued in and around Donetsk city. Shells fell on the Kalininskyi district of Donetsk, and the Donbas Battalion continued to fight against the insurgents that had trapped them in Ilovaisk for days. NATO commander Brig. Gen. Nico Tak said on 28 August that "well over" 1,000 Russian soldiers were operating in the Donbas conflict zone. Amidst what The New York Times described as "chaos" in the conflict zone, the insurgents re-captured Savur-Mohyla.

Despite these advances by pro-Russian forces, the National Guard of Ukraine temporarily retook the city of Komsomolske in Starobesheve Raion of Donetsk Oblast on 29 August. However, two days later, Ukrainian forces retreated from the city, and Komsomolske was once again taken by the DPR forces. Elsewhere, Ukrainian forces retreated from Novosvitlivka after being attacked by what they said were "Russian tanks". They said that every house in the village was destroyed. The trapped Donbas Battalion withdrew from Ilovaisk on 30 August after negotiating an agreement with pro-Russian forces. According to some of the troops who withdrew from Ilovaisk, DPR forces violated the agreement and fired on them whilst they retreated under white flags, killing as many as several dozen.

A Ukrainian patrol boat in the Sea of Azov was hit by shore-based artillery fire on 31 August. Eight sailors were rescued from the sinking boat, whilst two crew-members were missing. Former insurgent commander Igor Girkin said that the insurgents had "dealt the enemy their first naval defeat". Government forces withdrew from Luhansk International Airport on 1 September, despite having held the airport from insurgent attacks for weeks prior. The airport saw fierce fighting on the night before the withdrawal, and Ukrainian officials said that their forces at the airport had been attacked by a column of Russian tanks. Clashes also continued at Donetsk International Airport.

Heavy fighting was observed by OSCE monitors near the villages of Shyrokyne and Bezimenne on 4 September. Ukrainian officials in Mariupol said that the situation there "was worsening by the hour", and that there was an imminent danger of an attack on the city. DPR forces came within  of the city on 4 September, but their advance was repulsed by an overnight counter-attack launched by the Armed Forces and the Azov Battalion. Constant shelling was heard on the outskirts of Mariupol.

September 2014 ceasefire 

After days of peace talks in Minsk under the auspices of the Organization for Security and Co-operation in Europe (OSCE), Ukraine, Russia, the DPR, and the LPR agreed to a ceasefire on 5 September. OSCE monitors said they would observe the ceasefire, and assist the Ukrainian government in implementing it. According to The New York Times, the agreement was an "almost verbatim" replication of Ukrainian president Petro Poroshenko's failed June "15-point peace plan". It was agreed that there would be an exchange of all prisoners taken by both sides, and that heavy weaponry should be removed from the combat zone.

Humanitarian corridors were meant to be maintained so that civilians could leave affected areas. President Poroshenko said that Donetsk and Luhansk oblasts would be granted "special status", and that use of the Russian language in these areas would be protected by law. Russia started a more robust train and equip operation to strengthen separatists forces. DPR and LPR leaders said that they retained their desire for full independence from Ukraine, despite these concessions. Russian president Vladimir Putin and Ukrainian president Poroshenko discussed the ceasefire on 6 September. Both parties said that they were satisfied with the ceasefire, and that it was generally holding.

The ceasefire was broken multiple times on the night of 6–7 September, and into the day on 7 September. These violations resulted in the deaths of four Ukrainian soldiers, whilst 29 were injured. Heavy shelling by the insurgents was reported on the eastern outskirts of Mariupol, and OSCE monitors said that the Ukrainian government had fired rockets from Donetsk International Airport. The OSCE said that these breaches of the agreement would not cause the ceasefire to collapse. Ukrainian president Petro Poroshenko said on 10 September that "70% of Russian troops have been moved back across the border", and also added that this action gave him "hope that the peace initiatives have good prospects".

Ceasefire violations continued, however. In line with the Minsk Protocol, OSCE monitors said that they observed a prisoner exchange near Avdiivka at 03:40 on 12 September. Ukrainian forces released 31 DPR insurgents, whilst DPR forces released 37 Ukrainian soldiers. OSCE monitors documented violations of the Minsk Protocol in numerous areas of Donetsk Oblast from 13 to 15 September. These areas included Makiivka, Telmanove, Debaltseve, Petrovske, near Mariupol, Yasynuvata, and Donetsk International Airport, all of which saw intense fighting. Two of the armoured vehicles that the monitors were travelling in were struck by shrapnel, rendering one of the vehicles inoperable and forcing the monitors to retreat.

According to the monitors, troop and equipment movements were being carried out by both DPR and Ukrainian forces. They also said that there were "command and control issues" amongst both parties to the conflict. A visit by the monitors to Luhansk International Airport took place on 20 September. They said that the airport was "completely destroyed", and entirely unusable. Ukrainian president Petro Poroshenko said on 21 September that the Armed Forces of Ukraine lost between 60% and 65% of its total active equipment over the course of the war.

Members of the Trilateral Contact Group and the DPR took part in a video conference on 25 September 2014. According to a statement released by the OSCE on the day after the conference, all parties agreed that the fighting had "subsided in recent days", and that the "situation along 70%" of the buffer zone was "calm". They also said that they would "spare no efforts" to strengthen the ceasefire. Scattered violations of the ceasefire continued.

In the most significant incident since the start of the ceasefire, seven Ukrainian soldiers died on 29 September when a tank shell struck the armoured personnel carrier that they were travelling in near Donetsk International Airport. A skirmish ensued, leaving many soldiers wounded. Over the next few days, fighting continued around Donetsk International Airport, whilst Donetsk city itself came under heavy shelling. Amidst this renewed violence, OSCE chairman Didier Burkhalter issued a statement that "urged all sides to immediately stop fighting", and also said that putting the ceasefire at risk of collapse would be "irresponsible and deplorable".

According to a report released by the UN Office of the United Nations High Commissioner for Human Rights (OHCHR) on 8 October, the ceasefire implemented by the Minsk Protocol was becoming "increasingly fragile". The statement that announced the release of the report said that at least 331 people had been killed since the start of ceasefire, and that the most fierce fighting took place around Donetsk International Airport, Debaltseve, and Shchastia. The report said that the majority of civilian deaths were caused by both insurgent and Ukrainian shelling.

Several hundred National Guard troops protested outside the Ukrainian presidential administration building in Kyiv on 13 October. They demanded the end of conscription, and their own demobilisation. According to Kyiv Post, many of the protesters stated that they had clashed with Euromaidan protesters, and that they were not in favour of that movement.

November 2014 separatist elections and aftermath 

Heavy fighting continued across the Donbas through October, despite the ceasefire. In violation of the procedure agreed to as part of the Minsk Protocol, DPR and LPR authorities held parliamentary and executive elections on 2 November. In response to the elections, Ukrainian president Petro Poroshenko asked parliament to revoke the "special status" that was granted to DPR and LPR-controlled areas as part of the Minsk Protocol. DPR deputy prime minister Andrei Purgin said that Ukrainian forces had launched "all-out war" against the DPR and LPR on 6 November.

Ukrainian officials denied any offensive and said that they would adhere to the Minsk Protocol. Despite this, battles continued across the Donbas, leaving many soldiers dead. Concurrently, separatist representatives requested a redraughting of the Minsk Protocol, as a result of recurrent violations. Intermittent shelling of Donetsk renewed on 5 November. OSCE monitors reported on 8 November that there were large movements of unmarked heavy equipment in separatist-held territory.

These movements included armoured personnel carriers, lorries, petrol tankers, and tanks, which were being manned and escorted by men in dark green uniforms without insignias. Ukrainian government spokesmen said that these were movements of Russian troops, but this could not be independently verified. Overnight into 9 November, intense shelling from both government and insurgent positions rocked Donetsk. OSCE chairman Didier Burkhalter said that he was "very concerned" about the "resurgence of violence", and stressed the importance of adhering to the Minsk Protocol. OSCE monitors observed more munitions convoys in separatist-held territory on 9 November. These included 17 unmarked green ZiL lorries loaded with ammunition at Sverdlovsk, and 17 similar Kamaz lorries towing howitzers at Zuhres. Another convoy of 43 green military lories, some towing howitzers and rocket launchers, was observed by OSCE monitors in Donetsk on 11 November.

Following the reports of these troop and equipment movements, NATO General Philip Breedlove said on 12 November that he could confirm that Russian troops and heavy equipment had crossed into Ukraine during the preceding week. In response, the Ukrainian Defence Ministry said that it was preparing for a renewed offensive by pro-Russian forces. Russian Defence Ministry spokesman Major General Igor Konashenkov said "there was and is no evidence" to support NATO's statement.

By 2 December, at least 1,000 people had died during fighting in the Donbas, since the signing of the Minsk Protocol in early September. A BBC report said that the ceasefire had been "a fiction". In light of this continued fighting, Ukrainian and separatist forces agreed to cease all military operations for a "Day of Silence" on 9 December. Ukrainian president Petro Poroshenko said that he hoped that the "Day of Silence" would encourage the signing of a new peace deal. Whilst no new peace talks took place following the "Day of Silence", fighting between Ukrainian and separatist forces lessened significantly over the course of December. A report by the International Crisis Group stated that the late 2014 financial crisis in Russia, in tandem with American and European economic sanctions, deterred further advances by pro-Russian forces. The report also raised concerns about the potential for "humanitarian catastrophe" in separatist-controlled Donbas during the cold winter months, saying that the separatists were unable "to provide basic services for the population".

In line with the Minsk Protocol, more prisoner exchanges took place during the week of 21–27 December. More OSCE-organised talks were held in Minsk during that week, but they reached no result. In a press conference on 29 December, Ukrainian President Petro Poroshenko said that the Minsk Protocol was becoming effective "point by point", and also said that "progress" was being made. Since the signing of the Protocol, over 1,500 people held by the separatists had been released as part of the prisoner exchanges. Whereas Ukrainian forces had been losing about 100 men per day prior to the Protocol, only about 200 had been killed in the four months since its signing. Poroshenko also said that he believed that conflict would only end if Russian troops were to leave Donbas.

Escalation in January 2015 

OSCE monitors reported a "rise in tensions" following New Year's Day. Numerous ceasefire violations were recorded, with most occurring near Donetsk International Airport. Infighting amongst insurgent groups broke out in Luhansk Oblast. In one incident, LPR militants said that they had killed Alexander Bednov, the leader of the pro-Russian "Batman Battalion", on 2 January 2015. LPR officials said that Bednov had been running an "illegal prison", and that he had engaged in torturing prisoners. In another incident, the leader of an Antratsyt-based Don Cossack militant group, Nikolai Kozitsyn, said that the territory controlled by his group, claimed by the Luhansk People's Republic, had become part of the "Russian empire", and that Russian president Vladimir Putin was its "emperor". An intercity bus stopped at a government checkpoint in Buhas was hit by a Grad rocket on 13 January, killing 12 civilians. Ukrainian president Petro Poroshenko declared a day of national mourning.

The new terminal building at Donetsk International Airport, which had been a site of fighting between Ukrainian and separatist troops since May 2014, was captured by the DPR forces on 15 January. In the days prior to the capturing, the airport was heavily barraged by separatist rocket fire. DPR leader Alexander Zakharchenko stated that the capture of the airport was the first step toward regaining territory lost to Ukrainian forces during the middle of 2014. He said "Let our countrymen hear this: We will not just give up our land. We will either take it back peacefully, or like that", referring to the capture of the airport.

Such an offensive by separatist forces would signal the complete breakdown of the frequently ignored Minsk Protocol, which established a buffer zone between Ukrainian-controlled and separatist-controlled territories. Ukrainian forces said that there had been "no order to retreat" from the airport, and DPR parliament chairman Andrey Purgin said that while DPR forces had gained control of the terminal buildings, fighting was ongoing because "the Ukrainians have lots of places to hide". Concurrently, a new round of Minsk talks, scheduled for 16 January by the Trilateral Contact Group on Ukraine, was called off after DPR and LPR leaders Alexander Zakharchenko and Igor Plotnitsky refused to attend.

A government military operation at the weekend of 17–18 January resulted in Ukrainian forces recapturing most of Donetsk International Airport. According to Ukrainian NSDC representative Andriy Lysenko, the operation restored the lines of control established by the Minsk Protocol, and therefore did not constitute a violation of it. The operation caused fighting to move toward Donetsk proper, resulting in heavy shelling of residential areas of the city that border the airport. DPR authorities said that they halted government forces at Putylivskiy bridge, which connects the airport and the city proper. The bridge, which is strategically important, was destroyed during the fighting. OSCE monitors reported that shelling had caused heavy damage in the Donetsk residential districts of Kyivskyi, Kirovskyi, Petrovskyi, and Voroshilovskyi.

Ukrainian President Petro Poroshenko said on 21 January that Russia had deployed more than 9,000 soldiers and 500 tanks, artillery units, and armoured personnel carriers in the Donbas. An article that appeared in The Daily Telegraph said that deployment appeared to be "a response to Kyiv's success" in retaining control of Donetsk International Airport. On the same day, Ukrainian forces attempted to surround the airport in an attempt to push back the insurgents.

As Ukrainian and DPR forces fought away from the airport, a group of insurgents stormed the first and third floors of the new terminal building. Ukrainian troops held out on the second floor of the building until the ceiling collapsed, killing several soldiers. The remaining Ukrainian forces were either captured, killed, or were forced to withdraw from the airport, allowing DPR forces to overrun it. According to one volunteer, 37 Ukrainian troops died. The Daily Telegraph called the Ukrainian defeat at the airport "devastating".

Following this victory, separatist forces began to attack Ukrainian forces along the line of control in Donetsk and Luhansk oblasts. Particularly heavy fighting broke out along the Siverskyi Donets River, to the north-west of Luhansk city. Separatist forces captured a Ukrainian checkpoint at Krymske, attacked other checkpoints in the area, and shelled villages near Shchastia.

Separatist forces began an assault on the government-controlled town of Debaltseve in north-eastern Donetsk Oblast, barraging it with artillery fire. The DPR launched an attack on Mariupol from Shyrokyne during the morning of 24 January. A hail of Grad rockets killed at least 30 people, and wounded another 83. Heavy fighting continued in Debaltseve over the next week, resulting in many civilian and combatant casualties.

French president François Hollande and German chancellor Angela Merkel put forth a new peace plan on 7 February. The Franco-German plan, drawn up after talks with Ukrainian president Petro Poroshenko and Russian president Vladimir Putin, was seen as a revival of the Minsk Protocol. President Hollande said that the plan was the "last chance" for resolution of the conflict. The plan was put forth in response to American proposals to send armaments to the Ukrainian government, something that Chancellor Merkel said would only result in a worsening of the crisis.

Fighting worsened in the run-up to the scheduled 11 February talks to discuss the Franco-German peace plan. DPR forces shelled the city of Kramatorsk on 10 February, which had last seen fighting in July 2014. The shelling targeted the city's Armed Forces headquarters, but also hit a nearby residential area. Seven people were killed, while 26 were wounded. The pro-government Azov Battalion launched an offensive to recapture separatist-controlled areas on the outskirts of Mariupol, centred on the village of Shyrokyne. Battalion commander Andriy Biletsky said his forces were moving toward Novoazovsk.

In October 2015 a member of the monitoring mission Maksim Udovichenko, delegated to OSCE by Russia, was suspended for "misbehavior" involving alcohol while in Severodonetsk and admitted he is actually a GRU officer.

Minsk II ceasefire and denouement 

The scheduled summit at Minsk on 11 February 2015 resulted in the signing of a new package of peacemaking measures, called Minsk II, on 12 February. The plan, similar in content to the failed Minsk Protocol, called for an unconditional ceasefire, to begin on 15 February, amongst many other measures. Despite the signing of Minsk II, fighting continued around Debaltseve. DPR forces said that ceasefire did not apply to Debaltseve, and continued their offensive. Ukrainian forces were forced to withdraw from the Debaltseve area on 18 February, leaving separatist forces in control of it.

In the week after the fall of Debaltseve to pro-Russian forces, fighting in the conflict zone abated. DPR and LPR forces began to withdraw artillery from the front lines as specified by Minsk II on 24 February, and Ukraine did so on 26 February. Ukraine reported that it had suffered no casualties during 24–26 February, something that had not occurred since early January 2015.

Minor skirmishes continued into March, but the ceasefire was largely observed across the combat zone. Ukrainian and separatist forces had withdrawn most of the heavy weaponry specified in Minsk II by 10 March. Minor violations of the ceasefire continued throughout March and into April, though it continued to hold, and the numbers of casualties reported by both sides were greatly reduced. Fighting flared up on 3 June 2015, when DPR insurgents launched an attack on government-controlled Marinka. Artillery and tanks were utilised in the battle there, which was described as the heaviest fighting since the signing of Minsk II.

An anti-war protest took place in Donetsk city on 15 June. The protest, the first of its kind in pro-Russian separatist-controlled territory, called for an end to the fighting in the Donbas. About 500 people, who had gathered outside the RSA building, shouted, "Stop the war!", "Give us back our houses, our homes are broken!", and "Get out of here!" Specifically, protesters demanded that the separatists cease firing rocket attacks from residential areas on the outskirts of Donetsk.

Whilst all parties to the conflict continued to support implementation of the measures specified by Minsk II, minor skirmishes continued on a daily basis through June and July 2015. Ukrainian troops suffered losses on a daily basis, and the ceasefire was labelled "unworkable" and "impossible to implement". Despite constant fighting and shelling along the line of contact, no territorial changes occurred. This state of stalemate led the war to be labelled a "frozen conflict".

Following months of ceasefire violations, the Ukrainian government, the DPR and the LPR jointly agreed to halt all fighting, starting on 1 September 2015. This agreement coincided with the start of the school year in Ukraine, and was intended to allow for another attempt at implementing the points of Minsk II. By 12 September, German Foreign Minister Frank-Walter Steinmeier said that the ceasefire had been holding, and that the parties to the conflict were "very close" to reaching an agreement to withdraw heavy weaponry from the line of contact, as specified by Minsk II. The area around Mariupol, including Shyrokyne, saw no fighting. According to Ukrainian Defence Minister Stepan Poltorak, violence in the Donbas had reached its lowest level since the start of the war.

Whilst the ceasefire continued to hold into November, no final settlement to the conflict was agreed. The New York Times described this result as part of "a common arc of post-Soviet conflict, visible in the Georgian enclaves of South Ossetia and Abkhazia, Nagorno-Karabakh in Azerbaijan and in Transnistria", and said that separatist-controlled areas had become a "frozen zone", where people "live in ruins, amid a ruined ideology, in the ruins of the old empire." This state of affairs continued into 2016, with a 15 April report by the BBC labelling the conflict as "Europe's forgotten war". Minor outbreaks of fighting continued along the line of contact, though no major territorial changes occurred.

A new ceasefire came into effect on 1 September 2016, described at the time by BBC correspondent Tom Burridge as "the first time there has been a true halt to fighting in 11 months", and in 2018 described by TASS as the most successful ceasefire over the course of the conflict, due to it lasting six weeks. Within days both sides accused each other of breaching the ceasefire, although they also stated that the ceasefire was widely observed. Nevertheless, on 6 September (2016), Ukrainian authorities reported the death of yet another soldier. On 24 December 2016, the tenth indefinite ceasefire since the start of the conflict came into effect; according to the OSCE Special Monitoring Mission in Ukraine, the Ukrainian government, and the separatists, the ceasefire was not observed.

January 2017 eruption of heavy fighting and failed ceasefires 

2016 was the first full calendar year of the conflict in which Ukraine lost no territories to pro-Russian forces. In addition, both the Ukrainian Armed Forces (211 combat losses and 256 non-combat losses) and the local populace (13 in Ukrainian government-controlled areas) suffered significantly less casualties than in 2015. The new year, however, brought a new eruption of heavy fighting, starting on 29 January 2017, centred on the Ukrainian-controlled city of Avdiivka.

On 18 February 2017, Russian president Vladimir Putin signed a decree whereby the Russian authorities would recognise personal and vehicle-registration documents issued by the DPR and LPR. The presidential decree referred to "permanent residents of certain areas of Ukraine's Donetsk and Luhansk Oblasts", without any mention of the self-proclaimed People's Republics. Ukrainian authorities decried the decree as being directly contradictory to the Minsk II agreement and that it "legally recognised the quasi-state terrorist groups which cover Russia's occupation of part of Donbas." Secretary General of the Organization for Security and Co-operation in Europe (OSCE) Lamberto Zannier stated on 19 February the decree "implies...recognition of those who issue the documents, of course" and that it would make it more difficult to hold a ceasefire.

Russian foreign minister Sergey Lavrov, after meeting with his Ukrainian, German and French counterparts in Munich on 18 February, said that a ceasefire between Ukraine and the separatists had been agreed effective from 20 February 2017. But according to a Ukrainian Armed Forces spokesman on 20 February 2017 separatists attacks continued, although he did state there was a "significant reduction in military activity." On 21 February OSCE's Secretary General Zannier stated there were still a significant number of violations of the cease-fire and "no evidence of the withdrawal of weapons".

According to both parties to the conflict, the fourth truce attempt of 2017 collapsed within a few hours on 24 June 2017. A "back to school ceasefire" to begin on 25 August 2017 also immediately collapsed when, on that very day, both combatants claimed that the other side had violated it. A further "Christmas ceasefire" that was to be upheld starting 00:00 (Eastern European Time) on 23 December 2017 was immediately broken by DPR and LPR forces according to the Ukrainian Armed Forces (reporting nine violations including the death of a Ukrainian soldier killed by an enemy sniper and claiming the Ukrainians had not fired back). In turn, the DPR stated that the Ukrainian Armed Forces had broken the truce, while the LPR Luganskinformcenter news agency said the same, but also that, the "ceasefire is generally observed." On 27 December 2017, as part of the Minsk deal, a prisoner swap was conducted with 73 Ukrainian soldiers exchanged for over 200 separatists.

On 18 January 2018, the Ukrainian parliament passed a bill to regain control over separatist-held areas. The bill was adopted with support from 280 lawmakers in the 450-seat Verkhovna Rada (due to the war in the Donbas and the 2014 Russian annexation of Crimea, only 423 of the parliament's 450 seats were elected in the previous election). The Russian government denounced the bill, calling it "preparations for a new war", and accused the Ukrainian government of violating the Minsk agreement. The law on the reintegration of Donbas labeled the republics of Donetsk and Luhansk as "temporarily-occupied territories", while Russia was labeled as an "aggressor". The legislation granted President Poroshenko "the right to use military force inside the country, without consent from the Ukrainian parliament", which would include the reclaiming of Donbas. The bill supports a ban on trade and a transport blockade of the east that has been in place since 2017. Under the legislation, the only separatist-issued documents that Ukraine would recognize are birth and death certificates.

A new ceasefire agreed by all parties to the conflict went into force on 5 March 2018. By 9 March, the Ukrainian military claimed it was not being observed by the DPR and LPR forces, who in turn claimed the same of the Ukrainian military. On 26 March 2018, the Trilateral Contact Group on Ukraine agreed on a "comprehensive, sustainable and unlimited ceasefire" that was to start on 30 March 2018. It collapsed on its first day. Ukraine officially ended the "Anti-Terrorist Operation" (ATO), and replaced it with "Joint Forces Operation" (JFO) on 30 April 2018. According to Lieutenant-General Serhiy Nayev, the commander of the Joint Forces Operation, the renaming was intended to signify that Ukraine was not fighting against indigenous "terrorists" or "separatist militants" in the Donbas, but against the Russian military. On the same day, the United States confirmed that it had delivered Javelin anti-tank missiles to Ukraine. According to The Washington Post, the missiles will be kept away from the front line, and would be used only in the case of an all-out separatist assault.

On 28 June 2018, a new "harvest" "comprehensive and indefinite ceasefire regime" was agreed set to start on 1 July 2018. Within hours after its start both pro-Russian and Ukrainian sides accused each other of violating this truce. The 29 August 2018 ceasefire also failed. On 31 August 2018, DPR leader Alexander Zakharchenko was killed in an explosion at a restaurant.

As reported on 27 December 2018, Yuriy Biriukov, an advisor to Ukrainian President Petro Poroshenko, claimed that almost the entire "grey zone" between the warring sides had been liberated from Russian-led forces without breaching the Minsk peace agreements, and came under the control of the Ukrainian Armed Forces. This was confirmed the following day by Chief of the General Staff of the Armed Forces of Ukraine Viktor Muzhenko. On the same day, a new (and the 22nd attempt at an) indefinite truce starting midnight 29 December was agreed. Both the Ukrainians and the separatists accused each other of violating the ceasefire on the day it came into effect.

On 7 March 2019, the Trilateral Contact Group on Ukraine agreed on a new truce to start on 8 March 2019. Although Ukraine claimed that "Russian proxies" (the separatists) had violated it on the same day, fighting did die down, with the Ukrainian side stating that the ceasefire was fully observed from 10 March 2019. In June, Russia began distributing Russian passports to Ukrainians living in the regions of Donbas. Which was considered by Ukrainian government as a step towards annexation of the region.

October 2019 Steinmeier formula agreement and July 2020 ceasefire

Following extensive negotiations, Ukraine, Russia, the DPR, LPR, and the OSCE signed an agreement to try to end the conflict in the Donbas on 1 October 2019. Called the "Steinmeier formula", after its proposer, German President Frank-Walter Steinmeier, the agreement envisages free elections in DPR and LPR territories, observed and verified by the OSCE, and the subsequent reintegration of those territories into Ukraine with special status. Russia demanded the agreement's signing before any continuation of the "Normandy format" peace talks. A survey of public opinion in DPR and LPR-controlled Donbas conducted by the Centre for East European and International Studies in March 2019 found that 55% of those polled favoured reintegration with Ukraine. 24% of those in favour of reintegration supported a return to the pre-war administrative system for Donetsk and Luhansk oblasts, while 33% percent supported special status for the region.

In line with the Steinmeier formula, Ukrainian and separatist troops began withdrawing from the town of Zolote on 29 October. Attempts to withdraw earlier in the month had been prevented by protests from Ukrainian war veterans. A further withdrawal was successfully completed in Petrovske during November. Following the withdrawals, and a successful Russian–Ukrainian prisoner swap, Russian president Vladimir Putin, Ukrainian president Volodymyr Zelenskyy, French president Emmanuel Macron and German chancellor Angela Merkel met in Paris on 9 December 2019 in a resumption of the Normandy format talks. The two sides agreed to exchange all remaining prisoners of war by the end of 2019, work toward new elections in the Donbas, and schedule further talks.

The COVID-19 pandemic deteriorated the living conditions in the conflict zone. Particularly, quarantine measures imposed by Ukraine, the DPR, and the LPR prevented those in the occupied territories from crossing the line of contact, negating access to critical resources. Fighting increased in March 2020, with nineteen civilians killed, more than in the previous five months combined. While some crossings opened to small numbers of people in June 2020, the DPR introduced new regulations, ostensibly to prevent the spread of coronavirus, which made it nigh impossible for most people to cross the line of contact. In contrast, the Russian border completely reopened.

The 29th attempt at a "full and comprehensive" ceasefire came into effect on 27 July 2020. During his 24 August 2020 Ukrainian Independence Day speech, President Zelenskyy announced the ceasefire had held, leading to 29 days without combat losses. Zelenskyy also admitted, however, that despite the prisoner exchange and de-mining operations that had taken place, the peace process did not move as fast as he had expected when he signed the 9 December 2019 summit. On 6 September 2020, the Ukrainian Armed Forces reported its first combat loss since the 27 July 2020 truce, when a soldier was killed by shelling. Despite this, President Zelenskyy stated on 7 November 2020 that since the July 2020 ceasefire was established, deaths of Ukrainian soldiers in combat had decreased tenfold, and the number of attacks on soldiers decreased by five-and-a-half-fold. From 27 July 2020 until 7 November 2020, only three Ukrainian soldiers were killed.

2021–2022 escalation

According to Ukrainian authorities, in the first three months of 2021, 25 Ukrainian soldiers were killed in the conflict zone, compared to a total of 50 that had died in all of 2020. According to the Ombudsman of the DPR, 85 soldiers and 30 civilians were killed in January–October 2021 as a consequence of military action.

In late March–early April 2021, the Russian military moved large quantities of arms and equipment from western and central Russia, and as far away as Siberia, into occupied Crimea and the Voronezh and Rostov oblasts of Russia. A Janes intelligence specialist identified fourteen Russian military units from the Central Military District that had moved into the vicinity of the Russo-Ukrainian border, and called it the largest unannounced military movement since the 2014 invasion of Crimea. Commander-in-Chief of the Ukrainian Armed Forces Ruslan Khomchak said that Russia had stationed twenty-eight battalion tactical groups along the border, and that it was expected that twenty-five more were to be brought in, including in Bryansk and Voronezh oblasts in Russia's Western Military District. The following day, Russian state news agency TASS reported that fifty of its BTGs consisting of 15,000 soldiers were massed for drills in the Southern Military District, which includes occupied Crimea and also borders the Donbas conflict zone. By April 9, the head of the Ukrainian border guard estimated that 85,000 Russian soldiers were already in Crimea or within  of the Ukrainian border.

A Russian government spokesman said that the Russian military movements posed no threat, but Russian official Dmitry Kozak warned that Russian forces could act to "defend" Russian citizens in Ukraine, and any escalation of the Donbas conflict would mean "the beginning of the end of Ukraine" – "not a shot in the leg, but in the face". By this time, some half a million people in the self-proclaimed Donetsk People's Republic and Luhansk People's Republic had been issued Russian passports since fighting broke out in 2014. Russia refused to participate when Ukraine requested a Vienna Document meeting with France, Germany, and the OSCE. German chancellor Angela Merkel telephoned Russian president Vladimir Putin to demand a reversal of the buildup. United States White House press secretary Jen Psaki announced in early April 2021 that a buildup of Russian troops on Ukrainian border was the largest since 2014.

In April 2021, Ukraine performed the first operational rollout of Turkish-made Bayraktar TB2 military drones in the region. In November, a Bayraktar drone on the Ukrainian-government-controlled side of the line of contact was used to destroy a separatist artillery piece on the other side, which was conducting a strike that levelled homes and wounded and killed Ukrainian soldiers. In November, DNR leader Denis Pushilin said Ukrainian troops regained control of the village of Staromarivka in the grey zone. The use of Ukrainian and Russian drones was criticised by France and Germany, while the United States pointed out that the Russia-led side has repeatedly violated agreements by the use of drones and howitzer artillery. Russian agencies reported unease from the development, warning that further usage of the Bayraktar TB2 in the Donbas could "destabilize the situation" in the region.

In December 2021, Ukrainian authorities said that Russia was sending snipers and tanks to the region. On 21 January 2022, the Chairman of the Russian State Duma, Vyacheslav Volodin, called for a discussion in the parliamentary body to recognize the independence of the Donbas region and its separation from Ukraine. By February 2022, fighting had escalated. There was a sharp increase in artillery shelling by the Russian-led militants in Donbas, which was considered by Ukraine and its allies to be an attempt to provoke the Ukrainian army or create a pretext for invasion. For example, the Ukrainian military reported enduring 60 attacks along the line of contact on 17 February alone, including "one shell that struck a kindergarten near the front line, injuring three staff. There were two to five attacks per day over the first six weeks of this year".

Amid increased tensions between Russia and Ukraine in February 2022, Russian president Vladimir Putin announced on 21 February that Russia would recognise the independence of the Donetsk and Luhansk people's republics. This announcement was followed by an order to deploy Russian troops to the Donbas as "peacekeepers". A number of western countries, including the US, UK, and the EU, announced that they would impose new sanctions on Russian-connected organisations in response.

2022 full-scale Russian invasion of Ukraine 

On 24 February 2022, Russia launched a new, full-scale invasion of Ukraine. The DPR and LPR joined the offensive; the separatists stated that an operation to capture the entirety of Donetsk Oblast and Luhansk Oblast had begun. By 25 March 2022, Russian forces claimed control over 93 percent of Luhansk oblast and 54 percent of Donetsk oblast. Having encountered heavy resistance to its operations in other parts of Ukraine, Russia announced on the same day that it would shift its focus to the complete "liberation" of the Donbas.

Combatants

List of combatants

Diverse forces of both foreign and domestic origin participated in the war in the Donbas.

Russian involvement 

Russian involvement in the Donbas war has taken a variety of forms since the beginning of the conflict in 2014.

The initial protests across southern and eastern Ukraine were largely native expressions of discontent with the new Ukrainian government. Russian involvement at this stage was limited to voicing support for the demonstrations, and the emergence of the separatists in Donetsk and Luhansk began as a small fringe group of the protesters, independent of Russian control. Russia would go on to take advantage of this, however, to launch a co-ordinated political and military campaign against Ukraine, as part of the broader Russo-Ukrainian War, including several information campaigns and sporadic cyber attacks that started before Yanukovych's ouster in February. Russian president Vladimir Putin gave legitimacy to the nascent separatist movement when he described the Donbas as part of the historic "New Russia" (Novorossiya) region, and said he didn't understand how the region had ever become part of Ukraine in 1922, when the Ukrainian Soviet Socialist Republic was founded. When the Ukrainian authorities cracked down on the pro-Russian protests and arrested local separatist leaders in early March, these were replaced by people with ties to the Russian security services and interests in Russian businesses, probably by order of Russian intelligence. By April 2014, Russians citizens had taken control of the separatist movement, and were supported by volunteers and materiel from Russia, including Chechen and Cossack militants. According to DPR insurgent commander Igor Girkin, without this support in April, the movement would have fizzled out, as in it did in Kharkiv and Odesa.

As conflict between the separatists and the Ukrainian government escalated in May 2014, Russia began to employ a "hybrid approach", deploying a combination of disinformation tactics, irregular fighters, regular Russian troops, and conventional military support to support the separatists and destabilise the Donbas region. The First Battle of Donetsk Airport in late May 2014 marked a turning point in conflict; it was the first battle between the separatists and the Ukrainian government that involved large amounts of Russian volunteers. According to the Ukrainian government, at the height of the conflict in the summer of 2014, Russian paramilitaries were reported to make up between 15% to 80% of the combatants. According to the RAND Corporation, "Russia has armed, trained, and led the separatist forces. But even by Kyiv's own estimates, the vast majority of rebel forces consist of locals—not soldiers of the regular Russian military."

By August 2014, the Ukrainian "Anti-Terrorist Operation" was able to vastly shrink the territory under the control of the pro-Russian forces, and came close to regaining control of the Russo-Ukrainian border. Igor Girkin urged Russian military intervention, and said that the combat inexperience of his irregular forces, along with recruitment difficulties amongst the local population in Donetsk Oblast had caused the setbacks. He addressed Russian president Vladimir Putin, saying that: "Losing this war on the territory that President Vladimir Putin personally named New Russia would threaten the Kremlin's power and, personally, the power of the president". In response to the deteriorating situation in the Donbas, Russia abandoned its hybrid approach, and began a conventional invasion of the region. The first sign of this invasion was the 25 August 2014 capture of a group of Russian paratroopers on active service in Ukrainian territory by the Ukrainian security service (SBU). The SBU released photographs of them, and their names. On the following day, the Russian Defence Ministry said these soldiers had crossed the border "by accident". According to 's estimates, by mid-August 2014 during the Battle of Ilovaisk, there were between 20,000 and 25,000 troops fighting in the Donbas on the separatist side, and only between 40% and 45% were "locals".

Beginning on 27 August 2014, vast amounts of military equipment and troops crossed the border from Russia into southern Donetsk Oblast, an area previously controlled by the Ukrainian government. Western officials described this new offensive as a "stealth invasion" by the Russian Federation. US State Department spokesman Jen Psaki said that "these incursions indicate a Russian-directed counteroffensive is likely underway", and Ukrainian president Petro Poroshenko said "An invasion of Russian forces has taken place". NATO commander Brig. Gen. Nico Tak said on 28 August 2014 that "well over" 1,000 Russian soldiers were operating in the Donbas conflict zone. During the week prior to the invasion, Russia shelled Ukrainian units from across the border. Cross-border shelling from Russia had been reported for six weeks from mid-July, during which the Russians launched 53 strikes at 40 different locations, severely impacting the Ukrainian military operation. At the time, Russian government spokesmen denied Russian intervention in the Donbas. These denials have been viewed as implausible, to the point where it seemed that the Russian government no longer cared about the appearance of propriety. There was limited support for separatism in the Donbas before the outbreak of the war, and little evidence of support for an armed uprising. Only Russian intervention prevented an immediate Ukrainian resolution to the conflict. As a result, in the run up to the August 2014 invasion, Russia had also decided to replace many of the hardline leaders of the separatist movement, including Igor Girkin and DPR prime minister Alexander Borodai. These replacements, taken together with the subsequent invasion, represented another turning point in the nature of the conflict. Given the recent military failings of the DPR and the LPR, Russia decided that it could no longer rely on a patchwork of irregular fighters in the Donbas, and ordered a change in leadership. It abandoned the hardline Russian citizen-led separatist project, which it had been unable to fully control, and replaced it with the idea of special status for Donbas within Ukraine, and a more obedient local-based DPR/LPR command. This represented a Russian attempt at "indigenisation" of the conflict, using the militarily insignificant local pro-Russian political activists as political cover for the advancement of Russian interests in Ukraine.

Russian forces and equipment participated in the Second Battle of Donetsk Airport and the Battle of Debaltseve. A report released by the Royal United Services Institute in March 2015 said that "the presence of large numbers of Russian troops on Ukrainian sovereign territory" had become a "permanent feature" of the war in the Donbas since the August 2014 invasion.

Following the Ukrainian defeat at Debaltseve, the parties to the conflict signed the Minsk II agreement to end the fighting on 15 February 2015. These terms were highly favourable to Russia, in that they required Ukraine to grant "special status" to the separatist-held areas, and reintegrate them into Ukraine, similar to the federalisation espoused by pro-Russian protesters in early 2014. This would establish a Russian "strategic hook" within Ukraine that could be used to prevent future integration of that country with the European Union or NATO. In a press conference on 17 December 2015, Russian president Vladimir Putin acknowledged for the first time that there had been a Russian military presence in the Donbas region, though he said that this did not mean that there were "Russian troops" there.

By September 2015, the separatist units, at the battalion level and up, were acting under direct command of officers of the Russian Armed Forces. Ukraine, the United States, and some analysts consider them to be under the command of Russia's 8th Combined Arms Army, which was re-formed within the Russian Southern Military District for this specific task in 2017.

As of February 2018, the number of separatist forces were estimated at 31,000 out of which 80% (25,000) were Donbas residents, 15% (≈5,000) were military contractors from Russia and other countries and 3% (900–1,000) were regular Russian armed forces personnel. On 24 April 2019, President Putin issued an executive order fast-tracking the process for obtaining Russian citizenship for residents of the territories held by the DPR and the LPR. This "passportisation" is similar to what Russia has done in other pro-Russian protectorates established following post-Soviet conflicts, including in Transnistria, Abkhazia, and South Ossetia.

Russia recognised the DPR and LPR as independent states on 21 February 2022, and subsequently ordered Russian troops into the Donbas conflict zone as "peacekeepers". This was followed by the launch of a full-scale invasion of Ukraine.

Military aid to Ukraine 
In December 2017, the United States provided Ukraine with lethal aid for the first time, in the form of Javelin antitank missiles. Initially, these were to be kept away from the front, but after a second delivery of similar weapon systems they were cleared for use anywhere. In September 2021, Kyiv commanded military forces drill in a common exercise with US and NATO partners. The use of Javelins on the front line was reported in November 2021.

Casualties 

The estimated number of fatalities in the Donbas War was 14,200–14,400 by the end of December 2021, including non-combat military deaths. According to the Office of the United Nations High Commissioner for Human Rights, 6,500 were pro-Russian separatist forces, 4,400 were Ukrainian forces, and 3,404 were civilians. The vast majority of deaths were in the first two years of the war.

Civilians 
According to the United Nations, 3,404 civilians were killed in the war and more than 7,000 were injured. The vast majority of civilian deaths were in the first two years of the war, while 365 civilians were killed in the six years from 2016 to 2021. In the year before Russia's full-scale invasion, 25 civilians were killed, over half of them from mines and unexploded ordnance.

Of the civilian deaths, at least 312 were foreigners: 298 passengers and crew of Malaysia Airlines Flight 17, 11 Russian journalists, an Italian journalist, a Lithuanian diplomat, and one Russian civilian killed in cross-border shelling.

Of the 3,106 conflict-related civilian deaths, not counting the fatalities from the shoot down of Malaysia Airlines Flight 17: 1,852 were men, 1,072 women, 102 boys, 50 girls and 30 adults whose sex is unknown.

Ukrainian forces 

Ukraine reported that 4,647 of its servicemen had been killed by late February 2022, including 262 foreign-born Ukrainian citizens or foreigners. Another 70 Ukrainian soldiers were missing.

Pro-Russian sources claimed Ukrainian forces had 10,000 killed, 20,000 wounded and 13,500 deserted or missing, by late June 2015.

Separatist forces 
The separatists reported that they had lost 1,400 men at most by February 2015. The UN reported 6,500 separatists were killed by the end of December 2021.

Ukraine claimed 7,577 separatists had been killed and 12,000 were missing by early 2015. They claimed an additional 103 Russian servicemen were killed between January and April 2016.

An image of a reported separatist graveyard in Donetsk in late February 2015, showed numbers running up to at least 2,213. In late August 2015, according to a reported leak by a Russian news site, Business Life (Delovaya Zhizn), 2,000 Russian soldiers had been killed in Ukraine by February 2015. The US Department of State reported that 400–500 Russian soldiers had been killed by March 2015.

Between January 2017 and late February 2022, DPR separatist authorities reported that a total of 677 separatist fighters had been killed in DPR-controlled territory.

Humanitarian concerns 

The United Nations observed in May 2014 an "alarming deterioration" in human rights in territory held by insurgents affiliated with the Donetsk People's Republic and Luhansk People's Republic. The UN reported growing lawlessness in the region, documenting cases of targeted killings, torture, and abduction, primarily carried out by the forces of the Donetsk People's Republic. The UN also reported threats against, attacks on, and abductions of journalists and international observers, as well as beatings and attacks on supporters of Ukrainian unity. Russia criticised these reports, and said that they were "politically motivated".

A report by Human Rights Watch in 2014 said "Anti-Kyiv forces in eastern Ukraine are abducting, attacking, and harassing people they suspect of supporting the Ukrainian government or consider undesirable...anti-Kyiv insurgents are using beatings and kidnappings to send the message that anyone who doesn't support them had better shut up or leave". There were also multiple instances of beatings, abductions, and possible executions of local residents by Ukrainian troops, such as Oleh Lyashko's militia and the Aidar territorial defence battalion. In August, Igor Druz, a senior advisor to pro-Russian insurgent commander Igor Girkin, said that "On several occasions, in a state of emergency, we have carried out executions by shooting to prevent chaos. As a result, our troops, the ones who have pulled out of Sloviansk, are highly disciplined". By the end of 2015, there were 79 places in the combined DPR and LPR territory where abducted civilians and prisoners of war were held.

After the first Minsk Protocol ceasefire, warlords took control of districts on the separatist side.

A report by the United Nations Office of the High Commissioner for Human Rights (OHCHR) released on 28 July 2014 said that at least 750 million US dollars worth of damage has been done to property and infrastructure in Donetsk and Luhansk oblasts. Human Rights Watch said that Ukrainian government forces, pro-government paramilitaries, and the insurgents had used unguided Grad rockets in attacks on civilian areas, stating that "The use of indiscriminate rockets in populated areas violates international humanitarian law, or the laws of war, and may amount to war crimes". The New York Times reported that the high rate of civilian deaths had "left the population in eastern Ukraine embittered toward Ukraine's pro-Western government", and that this sentiment helped to "spur recruitment" for the insurgents.

As consequence of the conflict, large swathes of the Donbas region, on both sides of the "contact line", have become contaminated with landmines and other explosive remnants of war (ERW). According to the UN Humanitarian Coordinator in Ukraine, in 2020 Ukraine was one of the most mine-affected countries in the world, with nearly 1,200 mine/ERW casualties since the beginning of the conflict in 2014. A report by UNICEF released in December 2019 said that 172 children had been injured or killed due to landmines and other explosives, over 750 educational facilities had been damaged or destroyed, and 430,000 children lived with psychological traumas associated with war.

Displaced population 

By early August 2014, at least 730,000 had fled fighting in the Donbas and left for Russia. This number, much larger than earlier estimates, was given by the Office of the United Nations High Commissioner for Refugees (UNHCR). The number of internal refugees rose to 117,000. By the start of September, after a sharp escalation over the course of August, the number of people displaced from Donbas within Ukraine more than doubled to 260,000. The number of temporary asylum seekers and refugee applicants from Ukraine in Russia rose to 121,000. Despite two months of a shaky ceasefire established by the Minsk Protocol, the number of refugees displaced from Donbas in Ukraine escalated sharply to 466,829 in mid November.

By April 2015, the war had caused at least 1.3 million people to become internally displaced within Ukraine. In addition, more than 800,000 Ukrainians had sought asylum, residence permits, or other forms of legal stay in neighbouring countries, with over 659,143 in Russia, 81,100 in Belarus, and thousands more elsewhere.

According to another report by the UN OHCHR, over three million people continued to live in the Donbas conflict zone as of March 2016. This was said to include 2.7 million who lived in DPR and LPR-controlled areas, and 200,000 in Ukrainian-controlled areas adjacent to the line of contact. In addition, the Ukrainian government was said to have registered a total of 1.6 million internally displaced people within Ukraine who had fled the conflict. Over one million were reported to have sought asylum elsewhere, with most having gone to Russia. The report also said that people that lived in separatist-controlled areas were experiencing "complete absence of rule of law, reports of arbitrary detention, torture and incommunicado detention, and no access to real redress mechanisms".

By November 2017, the UN had identified 1.8 million internally displaced and conflict-affected persons in Ukraine, while another 427,240 who had sought asylum or refugee status in the Russian Federation, plus 11,230 in Italy, 10,495 in Germany, 8,380 in Spain, and 4,595 in Poland.

Reactions

Ukrainian public opinion 
A national survey held in March-April 2014 by the Kyiv International Institute of Sociology found that 31% of respondents in the Donbas wanted the region to separate from Ukraine, while 58% wanted autonomy within Ukraine. A September 2014 International Republican Institute poll of the Ukrainian public (excluding those in Russian-annexed Crimea) had 89% of respondents opposing Russian intervention in Ukraine. As broken down by region, 78% of those polled from Eastern Ukraine (including Dnipropetrovsk Oblast) opposed the intervention, along with 89% in Southern Ukraine, 93% in Central Ukraine, and 99% in Western Ukraine. As broken down by native language, 79% of Russian speakers and 95% of Ukrainian speakers opposed the intervention. 80% of those polled said that Ukraine should remain a unitary country.

56% of those polled said that Russia should pay for the reconstruction of the Donbas, whereas 32% said Donetsk and Luhansk oblasts should pay. 59% of those polled said that they supported the government military operation in the Donbas, whereas 33% said that they opposed it. 73% of respondents said that the war in the Donbas was one of the three most important issues facing Ukraine.

A poll conducted by the same institute in 2017 showed that  80% of Ukrainians nationally and 73% of people from the Ukrainian-controlled areas of Donbas believed the separatist republics should remain as part of Ukraine. Around 60% of the people polled did not believe Ukraine was doing enough to regain the lost territories because of the Minsk agreements.

A joint poll done by Levada and the Kyiv International Institute of Sociology from September to October 2020 found that in the breakaway regions controlled by the DPR/LPR, over half of the respondents wanted to join Russia (either with or without some autonomous status) while less than one-tenth wanted independence and 12% wanted reintegration into Ukraine. It contrasted with respondents in Kyiv-controlled Donbas, where a vast majority felt the separatist regions should be returned to Ukraine. According to results from Levada in January 2022, roughly 70% of those in the breakaway regions said their territories should become part of Russia.

Russia

A series of anti-war demonstrations took place in Russia in 2014. Protesters held two protest rallies on 2 and 15 March 2014. The latter, known as the March of Peace (Marsh Mira), took place in Moscow a day before the Crimean referendum. The protests were the largest in Russia since the 2011–13 Russian protests.

Boris Nemtsov said that the public opinion was being manipulated by means of agitation and propaganda, with those who opposed the government's policy denied access to the media.

International reactions

Labelling of the conflict 

The understanding of the nature of the conflict in the Donbas has evolved over time.

Chairman of the Verkhovna Rada Oleksandr Turchynov said in June 2014 that he considered the conflict a direct war with Russia. According to Ukrainian president Petro Poroshenko, the war will be known in history of Ukraine as the "Patriotic War".

NATO said in July 2014 that it considered the conflict a war with Russian irregulars, and others considered it to be a war between Russian proxies and Ukraine. The International Committee of the Red Cross described the events in the Donbas region as a "non-international armed conflict" in July 2014. Some news agencies, such as the Information Telegraph Agency of Russia and Reuters, interpreted this statement as meaning that Ukraine was in a state of "civil war". Following the August 2014 invasion by Russian forces, in early September 2014, Amnesty International said that it considered the war to be "international", as opposed to "non-international".

According to a VTSIOM survey taken in August 2014, 59% of the Russian citizens polled viewed the war in the Donbas as a civil war. Most of those polled said that direct war with Ukraine was either "absolutely impossible" or "extremely unlikely". 28% said that such a conflict could happen in the future.

Secretary General of Amnesty International Salil Shetty said that "satellite images, coupled with reports of Russian troops captured inside Ukraine and eyewitness accounts of Russian troops and military vehicles rolling across the border leave no doubt that this is now an international armed conflict". The conflict has also been classified as part of a "hybrid war" waged by Russia against Ukraine.

Until early 2015, the European Union tended to label the participants of the conflict as "foreign armed formations" or Russian-supported separatists. After the delivery of an IntCen classified report in January 2015, the official EU documents acknowledged the presence of the Russian military in the area and started openly referring to "Russian troops in Ukraine".

A 2015 paper released by the Royal United Services Institute and a 2017 report by the RAND Corporation document how the conflict evolved from a localised proxy conflict in its early stages to a hybrid war between Russian and Ukraine, and then to a limited conventional war with the August 2014 direct invasion by Russian troops.

The Prosecutor of the International Criminal Court issued a report in November 2016 as part of its preliminary examination. The report stated that by 30 April 2014, it seemed that the high intensity of military conflict had triggered the law of armed conflict with the "DPR" and "LPR" as parties.  It further stated that engagements between Ukrainian and Russian armed forces in eastern Ukraine suggested the existence of a parallel international armed conflict by 14 July 2014.  It observed that, if it were determined that Russia had exercised overall control over the militant groups, this would comprise only a single international armed conflict that would trigger application of the Rome Statute.  The day following the release of the report, Russia announced its intention to withdraw from joining the International Criminal Court (ICC).

In December 2021, the French newspaper Le Monde analyzed a shift in the Russian diplomatic label on the conflict. It was no longer about Ukraine membership in NATO, but about NATO expansion in Ukraine.

The District Court of The Hague delivered a judgment in the Malaysia Airlines Flight MH17 murder trial on 17 November 2022, including the conclusion that Russia exercised overall control over the DPR from mid-May 2014 onwards, and that therefore an international armed conflict was taking place (although the DPR defendants lacked combatant immunity due to their and Russia's denials of membership in the Russian Armed Forces). The European Court of Human Rights ruled on 25 January 2023 that from 11 May 2014 and at least up to 26 January 2022, separatist-controlled areas in eastern Ukraine were under the "spatial jurisdiction" of Russia, because it had effective control over these areas through its presence, and through its influence on the "DPR" and "LPR".

See also 

 Outline of the Russo-Ukrainian War
 December 2015 Ukraine power grid cyberattack
 2017 cyberattacks on Ukraine
 Little green men (Russo-Ukrainian War)
 Military history of the Russian Federation
 Donbas in Flames: Guide to the Conflict Zone

Notes

References

Further reading

External links

 
 Ivanov, O. (2016). Social Background of the Military Conflict in Ukraine: Regional cleavages and geopolitical orientations. Social, Health, And Communication Studies Journal, 2(1), 52–73. Retrieved 26 June 2017.
 12 May 2014 report on human rights and minority rights situation in Ukraine by the OSCE Office for Democratic Institutions and Human Rights
 15 July 2014 Report on the human rights situation in Ukraine by the OHCHR
 28 August 2014 report on claims of war crimes by the insurgents in Donbas by Human Rights Watch
 15 November 2014 Report on the human rights situation in Ukraine by the OHCHR
 1 December 2014 to 15 February 2015 Report on the human rights situation in Ukraine by the OHCHR

 
2010s in Ukraine
2020s in Ukraine
2010s conflicts
2020s conflicts
Conflicts in 2014
Conflicts in 2015
Conflicts in 2016
Conflicts in 2017
Conflicts in 2018
Conflicts in 2019
Conflicts in 2020
Conflicts in 2021
Conflicts in 2022
Donbas
History of Donetsk Oblast
History of Luhansk Oblast
Wars involving Russia
Wars involving Ukraine
Separatist rebellion-based civil wars

Prelude to the 2022 Russian invasion of Ukraine
Russian–Ukrainian wars
Wars involving the Donetsk People's Republic
Wars involving the Luhansk People's Republic